Light in painting fulfills several objectives, both plastic and aesthetic: on the one hand, it is a fundamental factor in the technical representation of the work, since its presence determines the vision of the projected image, as it affects certain values such as color, texture and volume; on the other hand, light has a great aesthetic value, since its combination with shadow and with certain lighting and color effects can determine the composition of the work and the image that the artist wants to project. Also, light can have a symbolic component, especially in religion, where this element has often been associated with divinity.

The incidence of light on the human eye produces visual impressions, so its presence is indispensable for the capture of art. At the same time, light is intrinsically found in painting, since it is indispensable for the composition of the image: the play of light and shadow is the basis of drawing and, in its interaction with color, is the primordial aspect of painting, with a direct influence on factors such as modeling and relief.

The technical representation of light has evolved throughout the history of painting, and various techniques have been created over time to capture it, such as shading, chiaroscuro, sfumato, or tenebrism. On the other hand, light has been a particularly determining factor in various periods and styles, such as Renaissance, Baroque, Impressionism, or Fauvism. The greater emphasis given to the expression of light in painting is called "luminism", a term generally applied to various styles such as Baroque tenebrism and impressionism, as well as to various movements of the late 19th century and early 20th century such as American, Belgian, and Valencian luminism.

Optics 
Light (from the Latin lux, lucis) is an electromagnetic radiation with a wavelength between 380 nm and 750 nm, the part of the visible spectrum that is perceived by the human eye, located between infrared and ultraviolet radiation. It consists of massless elementary particles called photons, which move at a speed of 299 792 458 m/s in a vacuum, while in matter it depends on its refractive index . The branch of physics that studies the behavior and characteristics of light is optics.

Light is the physical agent that makes objects visible to the human eye. Its origin can be in celestial bodies such as the sun, the moon, or the stars, natural phenomena such as lightning, or in materials in combustion, ignition, or incandescence. Throughout history, human beings have devised different procedures to obtain light in spaces lacking it, such as torches, candles, candlesticks, lamps or, more recently, electric lighting. Light is both the agent that enables vision and a visible phenomenon in itself, since light is also an object perceptible by the human eye. Light enables the perception of color, which reaches the retina through light rays that are transmitted by the retina to the optic nerve, which in turn transmits them to the brain by means of nerve impulses. The perception of light is a psychological process and each person perceives the same physical object and the same luminosity in a different way.Physical objects have different levels of luminance (or reflectance), that is, they absorb or reflect to a greater or lesser extent the light that strikes them, which affects the color, from white (maximum reflection) to black (maximum absorption). Both black and white are not considered colors of the conventional chromatic circle, but gradations of brightness and darkness, whose transitions make up the shadows. When white light hits a surface of a certain color, photons of that color are reflected; if these photons subsequently hit another surface they will illuminate it with the same color, an effect known as radiance  — generally perceptible only with intense light. If that object is in turn the same color, it will reinforce its level of colored luminosity, i.e. its saturation.
White light from the sun consists of a continuous spectrum of colors which, when divided, forms the colors of the rainbow: violet, indigo blue, blue, green, yellow, orange, and red. In its interaction with the Earth's atmosphere, sunlight tends to scatter the shorter wavelengths, i.e. the blue photons, which is why the sky is perceived as blue. On the other hand, at sunset, when the atmosphere is denser, the light is less scattered, so that the longer wavelengths, red, are perceived.

Color is a specific wavelength of white light. The colors of the chromatic spectrum have different shades or tones, which are usually represented in the chromatic circle, where the primary colors and their derivatives are located. There are three primary colors: lemon yellow, magenta red, and cyan blue. If they are mixed, the three secondary colors are obtained: orange red, bluish violet, and green. If a primary and a secondary are mixed, the tertiary colors are obtained: greenish blue, orange yellow, etc. On the other hand, complementary colors are two colors that are on opposite sides of the chromatic circle (green and magenta, yellow and violet, blue and orange) and adjacent colors are those that are close within the circle (yellow and green, red and orange). If a color is mixed with an adjacent color, it is shaded, and if it is mixed with a complementary color, it is neutralized (darkened). Three factors are involved in the definition of color: hue, the position within the chromatic circle; saturation, the purity of the color, which is involved in its brightness — the maximum saturation is that of a color that has no mixture with black or its complementary; and value, the level of luminosity of a color, increasing when mixed with white and decreasing when mixed with black or a complementary.

The main source of light is the sun and its perception can vary according to the time of day: the most normal is mid-morning or mid-afternoon light, generally blue, clear and diaphanous, although it depends on atmospheric dispersion and cloudiness and other climatic factors; midday light is whiter and more intense, with high contrast and darker shadows; dusk light is more yellowish, soft and warm; sunset light is orange or red, low contrast, with intense bluish shadows; evening light is a darker red, dimmer light, with weaker shadows and contrast (the moment known as alpenglow, which occurs in the eastern sky on clear days, gives pinkish tones); the light of cloudy skies depends on the time of day and the degree of cloudiness, is a dim and diffuse light with soft shadows, low contrast and high saturation (in natural environments there can be a mixture of light and shadow known as "mottled light"); finally, night light can be lunar or some atmospheric refraction of sunlight, is diffuse and dim (in contemporary times there is also light pollution from cities). We must also point out the natural light that filters indoors, a diffuse light of lower intensity, with a variable contrast depending on whether it has a single origin or several (for example, several windows), as well as a coloring also variable, depending on the time of day, the weather or the surface on which it is reflected. An outstanding interior light is the so-called "north light", which is the light that enters through a north-facing window, which does not come directly from the sun -always located to the south- and is therefore a soft and diffuse, constant and homogeneous light, much appreciated by artists in times when there was no adequate artificial lighting.

As for artificial light, the main ones are: fire and candles, red or orange; electric, yellow or orange — generally tungsten or wolfram — it can be direct (focal) or diffused by lamp shades; fluorescent, greenish; and photographic, white (flash light). Logically, in many environments there can be mixed light, a combination of natural and artificial light.

The visible reality is made up of a play of light and shadow: the shadow is formed when an opaque body obstructs the path of the light. In general, there is a ratio between light and shadow whose gradation depends on various factors, from lighting to the presence and placement of various objects that can generate shadows; however, there are conditions in which one of the two factors can reach the extreme, as in the case of snow or fog or, conversely, at night. We speak of high key lighting when white or light tones predominate, or low key lighting if black or dark tones predominate.

Shadows can be of shape (also called "self shadows") or of projection ("cast shadows"): the former are the shaded areas of a physical object, that is, the part of that object on which light does not fall; the latter are the shadows cast by these objects on some surface, usually the ground. Self shadows define the volume and texture of an object; cast shadows help define space. The lightest part of the shadow is the "umbra" and the darkest part is the "penumbra". The shape and appearance of the shadow depends on the size and distance of the light source: the most pronounced shadows are from small or distant sources, while a large or close source will give more diffuse shadows. In the first case, the shadow will have sharp edges and the darker area (penumbra) will occupy most of it; in the second, the edge will be more diffuse and the umbra will predominate. A shadow can receive illumination from a secondary source, known as "fill light". The color of a shadow is between blue and black, and also depends on several factors, such as light contrast, transparency and translucency. The projection of shadows is different if they come from natural or artificial light: with natural light the beams are parallel and the shadow adapts both to the terrain and to the various obstacles that may intervene; with artificial light the beams are divergent, with less defined limits, and if there are several light sources, combined shadows may be produced.

The reflection of light produces four derived phenomena: glints, which are reflections of the light source, be it the sun, artificial lights or incidental sources such as doors and windows; glares, which are reflections produced by illuminated bodies as a reflective screen, especially white surfaces; color reflections, produced by the proximity between various objects, especially if they are luminous; and image reflections, produced by polished surfaces, such as mirrors or water. Another phenomenon produced by light is transparency, which occurs in bodies that are not opaque, with a greater or lesser degree depending on the opacity of the object, from total transparency to varying degrees of translucency. Transparency generates filtered light, a type of luminosity that can also be produced through curtains, blinds, awnings, various fabrics, pergolas and arbors, or through the foliage of trees.

Pictorial representation of light 

In artistic terminology, "light" is the point or center of light diffusion in the composition of a painting, or the luminous part of a painting in relation to the shadows. This term is also used to describe the way a painting is illuminated: zenithal or plumb light (vertical rays), high light (oblique rays), straight light (horizontal rays), workshop or studio light (artificial light), etc. The term "accidental light" is also used to refer to light not produced by the sun, which can be either moonlight or artificial light from candles, torches, etc. The light can come from different directions, which according to its incidence can be differentiated between: "lateral", when it comes from the side, it is a light that highlights more the texture of the objects; "frontal", when it comes from the front, it eliminates the shadows and the sensation of volume; "zenithal", a vertical light of higher origin than the object, it produces a certain deformation of the figure; "contrapicado", vertical light of lower origin, it deforms the figure in an exaggerated way; and "backlight", when the origin is behind the object, thus darkening and diluting its silhouette.

In relation to the distribution of light in the painting, it can be: "homogeneous", when it is distributed equally; "dual", in which the figures stand out against a dark background; or "insertive", when light and shadows are interrelated. According to its origin, light can be intrinsic ("own or autonomous light"), when the light is homogeneous, without luminous effects, directional lights or contrasts of lights and shadows; or extrinsic ("illuminating light"), when it presents contrasts, directional lights and other objective sources of light. The first occurred mainly in Romanesque and Gothic art, and the second especially in the Renaissance and Baroque. In turn, the illuminating light can occur in different ways: "focal light", when it directly presents a light-emitting object ("tangible light") or comes from an external source that illuminates the painting ("intangible light"); "diffuse light", which blurs the contours, as in Leonardo's sfumato; "real light", which aims to realistically capture sunlight, an almost utopian attempt in which artists such as Claude of Lorraine, J. M. W. Turner or the impressionist artists were especially employed; and "unreal light", which has no natural or scientific basis and is closer to a symbolic light, as in the illumination of religious figures. As for the artist's intention, light can be "compositional", when it helps the composition of the painting, as in all the previous cases; or "conceptual light", when it serves to enhance the message, for example by illuminating a certain part of the painting and leaving the rest in semi-darkness, as Caravaggio used to do.
In terms of its origin, light can be "natural ambient light", in which no shadows of figures or objects appear, or "projected light", which generates shadows and serves to model the figures. It is also important to differentiate between source and focus of light: the source of light in a painting is the element that radiates the light, be it the sun, a candle or any other; the focus of light is the part of the painting that has the most luminosity and radiates it around the painting. On the other hand, in relation to the shadow, the interrelation between light and shadow is called "chiaroscuro"; if the dark area is larger than the illuminated one, it is called "tenebrism".Light in painting plays a decisive role in the composition and structuring of the painting. Unlike in architecture and sculpture, where light is real, the light of the surrounding space, in painting light is represented, so it responds to the will of the artist both in its physical and aesthetic aspect. The painter determines the illumination of the painting, that is to say, the origin and incidence of the light, which marks the composition and expression of the image. In turn, the shadow provides solidity and volume, while it can generate dramatic effects of various kinds.
In the pictorial representation of light it is essential to distinguish its nature (natural, artificial) and to establish its origin, intensity and chromatic quality. Natural light depends on various factors, such as the season of the year, the time of day (auroral, diurnal, twilight or nocturnal light — from the moon or stars) or the weather. Artificial light, on the other hand, differs according to its origin: a candle, a torch, a fluorescent, a lamp, neon lights, etc. As for the origin, it can be focused or act in a diffuse way, without a determined origin. The chromatism of the image depends on the light, since depending on its incidence an object can have different tonalities, as well as the reflections, ambiances and shadows projected. In an illuminated image the color is considered saturated at the correct level of illumination, while the color in shadow will always have a darker tonal value and will be the one that determines the relief and volume.
Light is linked to space, so in painting it is intimately linked to perspective, the way of representing a three-dimensional space in a two-dimensional support such as painting. Thus, in linear perspective, light fulfills the function of highlighting objects, of generating volume, through modeling, in the form of luminous gradations; while in aerial perspective, the effects of light are sought as they are perceived by the spectator in the environment, as another element present in the physical reality represented. The light source can be present in the painting or not, it can have a direct or indirect origin, internal or external to the painting. The light defines the space through the modeling of volumes, which is achieved with the contrast between light and shadow: the relationship between the values of light and shadow defines the volumetric characteristics of the form, with a scale of values that can range from a soft fade to a hard contrast. Spatial limits can be objective, when they are produced by people, objects, architectures, natural elements and other factors of corporeality; or subjective, when they come from sensations such as atmosphere, depth, a hollow, an abyss, etc. In human perception, light creates closeness and darkness creates remoteness, so that a light-darkness gradient gives a sensation of depth.Aspects such as contrast, relief, texture, volume, gradients or the tactile quality of the image depend on light. The play of light and shadow helps to define the location and orientation of objects in space. For their correct representation, their shape, density and extension, as well as their differences in intensity, must be taken into account. It should also be taken into account that, apart from its physical qualities, light can generate dramatic effects and give the painting a certain emotional atmosphere.
Contrast is a fundamental factor in painting; it is the language with which the image is shaped. There are two types of contrast: the "luminous", which can be by chiaroscuro (light and shadow) or by surface (a point of light that shines brighter than the rest); and the "chromatic", which can be tonal (contrast between two tones) or by saturation (a bright color with a neutral one). Both types of contrast are not mutually exclusive, in fact they coincide in the same image most of the time. Contrast can have different levels of intensity and its regulation is the artist's main tool to achieve the appropriate expression for his work. From the contrast between light and shadow depends the tonal expression that the artist wants to give to his work, which can range from softness to hardness, which gives a lesser or greater degree of dramatization. Backlighting, for example, is one of the resources that provide greater drama, since it produces elongated shadows and darker tones.

The correspondence between light and shadow and color is achieved through tonal evaluation: the lightest tones are found in the most illuminated areas of the painting and the darkest in those that receive less illumination. Once the artist establishes the tonal values, he chooses the most appropriate color ranges for their representation. Colors can be lightened or darkened until the desired effect is achieved: to lighten a color, lighter related colors — such as groups of warm or cool colors — are added to it, as well as amounts of white until the right tone is found; to darken, related dark colors and some blue or shadow are added. In general, the shade is made by mixing a color with a darker shade, plus blue and a complementary of the proper color (such as yellow and dark blue, red and primary blue or magenta and green).

The light and chromatic harmony of a painting depends on color, i.e. the relationship between the parts of a painting to create cohesion. There are several ways to harmonize: it can be done through "monochrome and tone dominant melodic ranges", with a single color as a base to which the value and tone is changed; if the value is changed with white or black it is a monochrome, while if the tone is changed it is a simple melodic range: for example, taking red as the dominant tone can be shaded with various shades of red (vermilion, cadmium, carmine) or orange, pink, violet, maroon, salmon, warm gray, etc. Another method is the "harmonic trios", which consists of combining three colors equidistant from each other on the chromatic circle; there can also be four, in which case we speak of "quaternions". Another way is the combination of "warm and cool thermal ranges": warm colors are for example red, orange, purple and yellowish green, as well as black; cool colors are blue, green and violet, as well as white (this perception of color with respect to its temperature is subjective and comes from Goethe's Theory of Colors). It is also possible to harmonize between "complementary colors", which is the one that produces the greatest chromatic contrast. Finally, "broken ranges" consist of neutralization by mixing primary colors and their complementary colors, which produces intense luminous effects, since the chromatic vibration is more subtle and the saturated colors stand out more.

Techniques 

The quality and appearance of the luminous representation is in many cases linked to the technique used. The expression and the different light effects of a work depend to a great extent on the different techniques and materials used. In drawing, whether in pencil or charcoal, the effects of light are achieved through the black-white duality, where white is generally the color of the paper (there are colored pencils, but they produce little contrast, so they are not very suitable for chiaroscuro and light effects). Pencil is usually worked with line and hatching, or by means of blurred spots. Charcoal allows the use of gouache and chalk or white chalk to add touches of light, as well as sanguine or sepia. Another monochrome technique is Indian ink, which generates very violent chiaroscuro, without intermediate values, making it a very expressive medium.
Oil painting consists of dissolving the colors in an oily binder (linseed, walnut, almond or hazelnut oil; animal oils), adding turpentine to make it dry better. The oil painting is the one that best allows to value the light effects and the chromatic tones. It is a technique that produces vivid colors and intense effects of brightness and brilliance, and allows a free and fresh stroke, as well as a great richness of textures. On the other hand, thanks to its long permanence in a fluid state, it allows for subsequent corrections.For its application, brushes, spatulas or scrapers can be used, allowing multiple textures, from thin layers and glazes to thick fillings, which produce a denser light.

Pastel painting is made with a pigment pencil of various mineral colors, with binders (kaolin, gypsum, gum arabic, fig latex, fish glue, candi sugar, etc.), kneaded with wax and Marseilles soap and cut into sticks. The color should be spread with a smudger, a cylinder of leather or paper used to smudge the color strokes. Pastel combines the qualities of drawing and painting, and brings freshness and spontaneity.

Watercolor is a technique made with transparent pigments diluted in water, with binders such as gum arabic or honey, using the white of the paper itself. Known since ancient Egypt, it has been a technique used throughout the ages, although with more intensity during the 18th and 19th centuries. As it is a wet technique, it provides great transparency, which highlights the luminous effect of the white color. Generally, the light tones are applied first, leaving spaces on the paper for the pure white; then the dark tones are applied.

In acrylic paint, a plastic binder is added to the colorant, which produces a fast drying and is more resistant to corrosive agents. The speed of drying allows the addition of multiple layers to correct defects and produces flat colors and glazes. Acrylic can be worked by gradient, blurred or contrasted, by flat spots or by filling the color, as in the oil technique.

Genres 
Depending on the pictorial genre, light has different considerations, since its incidence is different in interiors than in exteriors, on objects than on people. In interiors, light generally tends to create intimate environments, usually a type of indirect light filtered through doors or windows, or filtered by curtains or other elements. In these spaces, private scenes are usually developed, which are reinforced by contrasts of light and shadow, intense or soft, natural or artificial, with areas in semi-darkness and atmospheres influenced by gravitating dust and other effects caused by these spaces. A separate genre of interior painting is naturaleza muerta or "still life", which usually shows a series of objects or food arranged as in a sideboard. In these works the artist can manipulate the light at will, generally with dramatic effects such as side lights, frontal lights, zenithal lights, back lights, back-lights, etc. The main difficulty consists in the correct evaluation of the tones and textures of the objects, as well as their brightness and transparency depending on the material.
In exteriors, the main genre is landscape, perhaps the most relevant in relation to light in that its presence is fundamental, since any exterior is enveloped in a luminous atmosphere determined by the time of day and the weather and environmental conditions. There are three main types of landscapes: landscape, seascape, and skyscape. The main challenge for the artist in these works is to capture the precise tone of the natural light according to the time of day, the season of the year, the viewing conditions — which can be affected by phenomena such as cloud cover, rain or fog — and an infinite number of variables that can occur in a medium as volatile as the landscape. On numerous occasions artists have gone out to paint in nature to capture their impressions first hand, a working method known by the French term en plen air ("in the open air", equivalent to "outdoors"). There is also the variant of the urban landscape, frequent especially since the 20th century, in which a factor to take into account is the artificial illumination of the cities and the presence of neon lights and other types of effects; in general, in these images the planes and contrasts are more differentiated, with hard shadows and artificial and grayish colors.

Light is also fundamental for the representation of the human figure in painting, since it affects the volume and generates different limits according to the play of light and shadow, which delimits the anatomical profile. Light allows us to nuance the surface of the body, and provides a sensation of smoothness and softness to the skin. The focus of the light is important, since its direction influences the general contour of the figure and the illumination of its surroundings: for example, frontal light makes the shadows disappear, attenuating the volume and the sensation of depth, while emphasizing the color of the skin. On the other hand, a partially lateral illumination causes shadows and gives relief to the volumes, and if it is from the side, the shadow covers the opposite side of the figure, which appears with an enhanced volume. On the other hand, in backlighting the body is shown with a characteristic halo around its contour, while the volume acquires a weightless sensation. With overhead lighting, the projection of shadows blurs the relief and gives a somewhat ghostly appearance, just as it does when illuminated from below — although the latter is rare. A determining factor is that of the shadows, which generate a series of contours apart from the anatomical ones that provide drama to the image. Together with the luminous reflections, the gradation of shadows generates a series of effects of great richness in the figure, which the artist can exploit in different ways to achieve different results of greater or lesser effect. It should also be taken into account that direct light or shadow on the skin modifies the color, varying the tonality from the characteristic pale pink to gray or white. The light can also be filtered by objects that get in its path (such as curtains, fabrics, vases or various objects), which generates different effects and colors on the skin.

In relation to the human being, the portrait genre is characteristic, in which light plays a decisive role in the modeling of the face. Its elaboration is based on the same premises as those of the human body, with the addition of a greater demand in the faithful representation of the physiognomic features and even the need to capture the psychology of the character. The drawing is essential to model the features according to the model and, from there, light and color are again the vehicle of translation of the visual image to its representation on the canvas.

In the 20th century, abstraction emerged as a new pictorial language, in which painting is reduced to non-figurative images that no longer describe reality, but rather concepts or sensations of the artist himself, who plays with form, color, light, matter, space and other elements in a totally subjective way and not subject to conventionalisms. Despite the absence of concrete images of the surrounding reality, light is still present on numerous occasions, generally contributing luminosity to the colors or creating chiaroscuro effects by contrasting tonal values.

Chronological factor 

Another aspect in which light is a determining factor is in time, in the representation of chronological time in painting. Until the Renaissance, artists did not represent a specific time in painting and, in general, the only difference in light was between exterior and interior lights. In many occasions it is difficult to identify the specific time of day in a work, since neither the direction of the light nor its quality nor the dimension of the shadows are decisive elements to recognize a certain time of day. Night was rarely represented until practically Mannerism and, in the cases in which a nocturnal atmosphere was used, it was because the narrative required it or because of some symbolic aspect: in Giotto's The Annunciation to the Shepherds or in Ambrogio Lorenzetti's Annunciation, the nocturnal atmosphere contributes to accentuate the halo of mystery surrounding the birth of Christ; in Uccello's Saint George and the Dragon, night represents evil, the world in which the dragon lives. On the other hand, even in narrative themes that take place at night, such as the Last Supper or the supper at Emmaus, this factor is sometimes deliberately avoided, as in Andrea del Sarto's Last Supper, set in daylight.

Generally, the chronological setting of a scene has been linked to its narrative correlate, albeit in an approximate manner and with certain licenses on the part of the artist. Practically until the 19th century, it was not until the industrial civilization, thanks to the advances in artificial lighting, that a complete and exact use of the entire time zone was achieved, thanks to the advances in artificial illumination. But just as in the contemporary age time has had a more realistic component, in the past it was more of a narrative factor, accompanying the action represented: dawn was a time of travel or hunting; noon, of action or its subsequent rest; dusk, of return or reflection; night was sleep, fear or adventure, or fun and passion; birth was morning, death was night.

The temporal dimension began to gain relevance in the 17th century, when artists such as Claude Lorrain and Salvator Rosa began to detach landscape painting from a narrative context and to produce works in which the protagonist was nature, with the only variations being the time of day or the season of the year. This new conception developed with 18th century's Vedutism and 19th century's Romantic landscape, and culminated with the Impressionism.

The first light of the day is that of dawn, sunrise or aurora (sometimes the aurora, which would be the first brightness of the sky, is differentiated from dawn, which would correspond to sunrise). Until the 17th century, dawn appeared only in small pieces of landscape, usually behind a door or a window, but was never used to illuminate the foreground. The light of dawn generally has a spherical effect, so until the appearance of Leonardo's aerial perspective it was not widely used. In his Dictionary of the Fine Arts of Design (1797), Francesco Milizia states that:

For Milizia, the light of dawn was the most suitable for the representation of landscapes.
Noon and the hours immediately before and after have always been a stable frame for an objective representation of reality, although it is difficult to pinpoint the exact moment in most paintings depending on the different light intensities. On the other hand, the exact noon was discouraged by its extreme refulgence, to the point that Leonardo advised that:

Milizia also points out that:

Most art treatises advised the afternoon light, which was the most used especially from the Renaissance to the 18th century. Vasari advised to place the sun to the east because "the figure that is made has a great relief and great goodness and perfection is achieved".

In the early days of modern painting, the sunset used to be circumscribed to a celestial vault characterized by its reddish color, without an exact correspondence with the illumination of figures and objects. It was again with Leonardo that a more naturalistic study of twilight began, pointing out in his notes that:

For Milizia this moment is risky, since "the more splendid these accidents are (the flaming twilight is always an excess), the more they must be observed to represent them well".

Finally, the night has always been a singularity within painting, to the point of constituting a genre of its own: the nocturne. In these scenes the light comes from the moon, the stars or from some type of artificial illumination (bonfires, torches, candles or, more recently, gas or electric light). The justification for a night scene has generally been given from iconographic themes occurring in this time period. In the 14th century painting began to move away from the symbolic and conceptual content of medieval art in search of a figurative content based on a more objective spatio-temporal axis. Renaissance artists were refractory to the nocturnal setting, since their experimentation in the field of linear perspective required an objective and stable frame in which full light was indispensable. Thus, Lorenzo Ghiberti stated that "it is not possible to be seen in darkness" and Leonardo wrote that "darkness means complete deprivation of light". Leonardo advised a night scene only with the illumination of a fire, as a mere artifice to make a night scene diurnal. However, Leonardo's sfumato opened a first door to a naturalistic representation of the night, thanks to the chromatic decrease in the distance in which the bluish white of Leonardo's luminous air can become a bluish black for the night: just as the first creates an effect of remoteness, the second provokes closeness, the dilution of the background in the gloom. This tendency will have its climax in baroque tenebrism, in which darkness is used to add drama to the scene and to emphasize certain parts of the painting, often with a symbolic aspect. On the other hand, in the 17th century the representation of the night acquired a more scientific character, especially thanks to the invention of the telescope by Galileo and a more detailed observation of the night sky. Finally, advances in artificial lighting in the 19th century boosted the conquest of nighttime, which became a time for leisure and entertainment, a circumstance that was especially captured by the Impressionists.

Symbology 

Light has had on numerous occasions throughout the history of painting an aesthetic component, which identifies light with beauty, as well as a symbolic meaning, especially related to religion, but also with knowledge, good, happiness and life, or in general the spiritual and immaterial. Sometimes the light of the Sun has been equated with inspiration and imagination, and that of the Moon with rational thought. In contrast, shadows and darkness represent evil, death, ignorance, immorality, misfortune or secrecy. Thus, many religions and philosophies throughout history have been based on the dichotomy between light and darkness, such as Ahura Mazda and Ahriman, yin and yang, angels and demons, spirit and matter, and so on. In general, light has been associated with the immaterial and spiritual, probably because of its ethereal and weightless aspect, and that association has often been extended to other concepts related to light, such as color, shadow, radiance, evanescence, etc.

The identification of light with a transcendent meaning comes from antiquity and probably existed in the minds of many artists and religious people before the idea was written down. In many ancient religions the deity was identified with light, such as the Semitic Baal, the Egyptian Ra or the Iranian Ahura Mazda. Primitive peoples already had a transcendental concept of light — the so-called "metaphor of light" — generally linked to immortality, which related the afterlife to starlight. Many cultures sketched a place of infinite light where the souls rested, a concept also picked up by Aristotle and various Fathers of the Church such as Saint Basil and Saint Augustine. On the other hand, many religious rites were based on "illumination" to purify the soul, from ancient Babylon to the Pythagoreans.

In Greek mythology Apollo was the god of the Sun and has often been depicted in art within a disk of light. On the other hand, Apollo was also the god of beauty and the arts, a clear symbolism between light and these two concepts. Also related to light is the goddess of dawn, Eos (Aurora in Roman mythology). In Ancient Greece, light was synonymous with life and was also related to beauty. Sometimes the fluctuation of light was related to emotional changes, as well as to intellectual capacity. On the other hand, the shadow had a negative component, it was related to the dark and hidden, to evil forces, such as the spectral shadows of Tartarus. The Greeks also related the sun to "intelligent light" (φῶς νοετόν), a driving principle of the movement of the universe, and Plato drew a parallel between light and knowledge.

The ancient Romans distinguished between lux (luminous source) and lumen (rays of light emanating from that source), terms they used according to the context: thus, for example, lux gloriae or lux intelligibilis, or lumen naturale or lumen gratiae.

In Christianity, God is also often associated with light, a tradition that goes back to the philosopher Pseudo-Dionysius Areopagite (On the Celestial Hierarchy, On the Divine Names), who adapted a similar one from Neoplatonism. For this 5th century author, "Light derives from Good and is the image of Goodness". Later, in the 9th century, John Scotus Erigena defined God as "the father of lights". Already the Bible begins with the phrase "let there be light" (Ge 1:3) and points out that "God saw that the light was good" (Ge 1:4). This "good" had in Hebrew a more ethical sense, but in its translation into Greek the term καλός (kalós, "beautiful") was used, in the sense of kalokagathía, which identified goodness and beauty; although later in the Latin Vulgate a more literal translation was made (bonum instead of pulchrum), it remained fixed in the Christian mentality the idea of the intrinsic beauty of the world as the work of the Creator. On the other hand, the Holy Scriptures identify light with God, and Jesus goes so far as to affirm: "I am the light of the world, he who follows me will not walk in darkness, for he will have the light of life" (John 8:12). This identification of light with divinity led to the incorporation in Christian churches of a lamp known as "eternal light", as well as the custom of lighting candles to remember the dead and various other rites.

Light is also present in other areas of the Christian religion: the Conception of Jesus in Mary is realized in the form of a ray of light, as seen in numerous representations of the Annunciation; likewise, it represents the Incarnation, as expressed by Pseudo-Saint Bernard: "as the splendor of the sun passes through glass without breaking it and penetrates its solidity in its impalpable subtlety, without opening it when it enters and without breaking it when it leaves, so the Word God penetrates Mary's womb and comes forth from her womb intact." This symbolism of light passing through glass is the same concept that was applied to Gothic stained glass, where light symbolizes divine omnipresence. Another symbolism related to light is that which identifies Jesus with the Sun and Mary as the Dawn that precedes him. In addition to all this, in Christianity light can also signify truth, virtue and salvation. In patristics, light is a symbol of eternity and the heavenly world: according to Saint Bernard, souls separated from the body will be "plunged into an immense ocean of eternal light and luminous eternity". On the other hand, in ancient Christianity, baptism was initially called "illumination".

In Orthodox Christianity, light is, more than a symbol, a "real aspect of divinity," according to Vladimir Lossky. A reality that can be apprehended by the human being, as expressed by Saint Simeon the New Theologian:

Because of the opposition of light and darkness, this element has also been used on occasions as a repeller of demons, so that light has often been represented in various acts and ceremonies such as circumcision, baptisms, weddings or funerals, in the form of candles or fires.

In Christian iconography, light is also present in the halos of the saints, which used to be made —especially in medieval art — with a golden nimbus, a circle of light placed around the heads of saints, angels and members of the Holy Family. In Fra Angelico's The Annunciation, in addition to the halo, the artist placed rays of light radiating from the figure of the archangel Gabriel, to emphasize his divinity, the same resource he uses with the dove symbolizing the Holy Spirit. On other occasions, it is God himself who is represented in the form of rays of sunlight, as in The Baptism of Christ (1445) by Piero della Francesca. The rays can also signify God's wrath, as in The Tempest (1505) by Giorgione. On other occasions light represents eternity or divinity: in the vanitas genre, beams of light used to focus on objects whose transience was to be emphasized as a symbol of the ephemerality of life, as in Vanities (1645) by Harmen Steenwijck, where a powerful beam of light illuminates the skull in the center of the painting.

Between the 14th and 15th centuries Italian painters used supernatural-looking lights in night scenes to depict miracles: for example, in the Annunciation to the Shepherds by Taddeo Gaddi (Santa Croce, Florence) or in the Stigmatization of Saint Francis by Gentile da Fabriano (1420, private collection). In the 16th century, supernatural lights with brilliant effects were also used to point out miraculous events, as in Matthias Grünewald's Risen Christ (1512-1516, Isenheim altar, Museum Unterlinden, Colmar) or in Titian's Annunciation (1564, San Salvatore, Venice). In the following century, Rembrandt and Caravaggio identified light in their works with divine grace and as an agent of action against evil. The Baroque was the period in which light became more symbolic: in medieval art the luminosity of the backgrounds, of the halos of the saints and other objects — generally made with gold leaf — was an attribute that did not correspond to real luminosity, while in the Renaissance it responded more to a desire for experimentation and aesthetic delight; Rembrandt was the first to combine both concepts, the divine light is a real, sensory light, but with a strong symbolic charge, an instrument of revelation.

Between the 17th and 18th centuries, mystical theories of light were abandoned as philosophical rationalism gained ground. From transcendental or divine light, a new symbolism of light evolved that identified it with concepts such as knowledge, goodness or rebirth, and opposed it to ignorance, evil and death. Descartes spoke of an "inner light" capable of capturing the "eternal truths", a concept also taken up by Leibniz, who distinguished between lumière naturelle (natural light) and lumière révélée (revealed light).

In the 19th century light was related by the German Romantics (Friedrich Schlegel, Friedrich Schelling, Georg Wilhelm Friedrich Hegel) to nature, in a pantheistic sense of communion with nature. For Schelling, light was a medium in which the "universal soul" (Weltseele) moved. For Hegel, light was the "ideality of matter", the foundation of the material world.

Between the 19th and 20th centuries, a more scientific view of light prevailed. Science had been trying to unravel the nature of light since the early Modern Age, with two main theories: the corpuscular theory, defended by Descartes and Newton; and the wave theory, defended by Christiaan Huygens, Thomas Young and Augustin-Jean Fresnel. Later, James Clerk Maxwell presented an electromagnetic theory of light. Finally, Albert Einstein brought together the corpuscular and wave theories.

Light can also have a symbolic character in landscape painting: in general, dawn and the passage from night to day represent the divine plan — or cosmic system — that transcends the simple will of the human being; dawn also symbolizes the renewal and redemption of Christ. On other occasions, the sun and the moon have been associated with various vital forces: thus, the sun and the day are associated with the masculine, the vital force and energy; and the moon and the night with the feminine, rest, sleep and spirituality, sometimes even death.

In other religions light also has a transcendent meaning: in Buddhism it represents truth and the overcoming of matter in the ascent to nirvana. In Hinduism it is synonymous with wisdom and the spiritual understanding of participation with divinity (atman); it is also the manifestation of Krishna, the "Lord of Light". In Islam it is the sacred name Nûr. According to the Koran (24:35), "Allah is the light of the heavens and the earth. Light upon light! Allah guides to his light whomever he wills". In the Zohar of the Jewish Kabbalah the primordial light Or (or Awr) appears, and points out that the universe is divided between the empires of light and darkness; also in Jewish synagogues there is usually a lamp of "eternal light" or ner tamid. Finally, in Freemasonry, the search for light is considered the ascent to the various Masonic degrees; some of the Masonic symbols, such as the compass, the bevel and the holy book, are called "great lights"; also the principal Masonic officials are called "lights". On the other hand, initiation into Freemasonry is called "receiving the light".

History 

The use of light is intrinsic to painting, so it has been present directly or indirectly since prehistoric times, when cave paintings sought light and relief effects by taking advantage of the roughness of the walls where these scenes were represented. However, serious attempts at greater experimentation in the technical representation of light did not take place until classical Greco-Roman art: Francisco Pacheco, in El arte de la pintura (1649), points out that: "adumbration was invented by Surias, Samian, covering or staining the shadow of a horse, looked at in the sunlight". On the other hand, Apollodorus of Athens is credited with the invention of chiaroscuro, a procedure of contrast between light and shadow to produce effects of luminous reality in a two-dimensional representation such as painting. The effects of light and shadow were also developed by Greek scenographers in a technique called skiagraphia, consisting of the contrast between black and white to create contrast, to the point that they were called "shadow painters".

The first scientific studies on light also emerged in Greece: Aristotle stated in relation to colors that they are "mixtures of different forces of sunlight and the light of fire, air and water", as well as that "darkness is due to the deprivation of light". One of the most famous Greek painters was Apelles, one of the pioneers in the representation of light in painting. Pliny said of Apelles that he was the only one who "painted what cannot be painted, thunder, lightning and thunderbolts". Another outstanding painter was Nicias of Athens, of whom Pliny praised the "care he took with light and shade to achieve the appearance of relief".

With the emergence of landscape painting, a new method was developed to represent distance through gradations of light and shadow, contrasting more the plane closest to the viewer and progressively blurring with distance. These early landscape painters created the modeling through shades of light and shadow, without mixing the colors in the palette. Claudius Ptolemy explained in his Optics how painters created the illusion of depth through distances that seemed "veiled by air". In general, the strongest contrasts were made in the areas closest to the observer and progressively reduced towards the background. This technique was picked up by early Christian and Byzantine art, as seen in the apsidal mosaic of Sant'Apollinare in Classe, and even reached as far as India, as denoted in the Buddhist murals of Ajantā.

In the 5th century the philosopher John Philoponus, in his commentary on Aristotle's Meteorology, outlined a theory on the subjective effect of light and shadow in painting, known today as "Philoponus' rule":

This effect was already known empirically by ancient painters. Cicero was of the opinion that painters saw more than normal people in umbris et eminentia ("in shadows and eminences"), that is, depth and protrusion. And Pseudo-Longinus — in his work On the Sublime — said that "although the colors of shadow and light are on the same plane, side by side, the light jumps immediately into view and seems not only to stand out but actually to be closer."

Hellenistic art was fond of light effects, especially in landscape painting, as denoted in the stuccoes of La Farnesina. Chiaroscuro was widely used in Roman painting, as denoted in the illusory architectures of the frescoes of Pompeii, although it disappeared during the Middle Ages. Vitruvius recommended as more suitable for painting the northern light, being more constant due to its low mutability in tone. Later, in Paleochristian art, the taste for contrasts between light and shadow became evident — as can be seen in Christian sepulchral paintings and in the mosaics of Santa Pudenciana and Santa María la Mayor — in such a way that this style has sometimes been called "ancient impressionism".

Byzantine art inherited the use of illusionistic touches of light that were used in Pompeian art, but just as in the original its main function was naturalistic, here it is already a rhetorical formula far removed from the representation of reality. In Byzantine art, as well as in Romanesque art, which it powerfully influenced, the luminosity and splendor of shines and reflections, especially of gold and precious stones, were more valued, with a more aesthetic than pictorial component, since these shines were synonymous of beauty, of a type of beauty more spiritual than material. These briils were identified with the divine light, as did Abbot Suger to justify his expenditure on jewels and precious materials.

Both Greek and Roman art laid the foundations of the style known as classicism, whose main premises are truthfulness, proportion and harmony. Classicist painting is fundamentally based on drawing as a preliminary design tool, on which the pigment is applied taking into account a correct proportion of chromaticism and shading. These precepts laid the foundations of a way of understanding art that has lasted throughout history, with a series of cyclical ups and downs that have been followed to a greater or lesser extent: some of the periods in which the classical canons have been returned to were the Renaissance, Baroque classicism, neoclassicism and academicism.

Medieval art 

The art historian Wolfgang Schöne divided the history of painting in terms of light into two periods: "proper light" (eigenlicht), which would correspond to medieval art; and "illuminating light" (beleuchtungslicht), which would develop in modern and contemporary art (Über das Licht in der Malerei, Berlin, 1979).

In the Middle Ages, light had a strong symbolic component in art, since it was considered a reflection of divinity. Within medieval scholastic philosophy, a current called the aesthetics of light emerged, which identified light with divine beauty, and greatly influenced medieval art, especially Gothic art: the new Gothic cathedrals were brighter, with large windows that flooded the interior space, which was indefinite, without limits, as a concretion of an absolute, infinite beauty. The introduction of new architectural elements such as the pointed arch and the ribbed vault, together with the use of buttresses and flying buttresses to support the weight of the building, allowed the opening of windows covered with stained glass that filled the interior with light, which gained in transparency and luminosity. These stained-glass windows allowed the light that entered through them to be nuanced, creating fantastic plays of light and color, fluctuating at different times of the day, which were reflected in a harmonious way in the interior of the buildings.

Light was associated with divinity, but also with beauty and perfection: according to Saint Bonaventure (De Intelligentii), the perfection of a body depends on its luminosity ("perfectio omnium eorum quae sunt in ordine universo, est lux"). William of Auxerre (Summa Aurea) also related beauty and light, so that a body is more or less beautiful according to its degree of radiance. This new aesthetics was parallel in many moments to the advances of science in subjects such as optics and the physics of light, especially thanks to the studies of Roger Bacon. At this time the works of Alhacen were also known, which would be collected by Witelo in De perspectiva (ca. 1270-1278) and Adam Pulchrae Mulieris in Liber intelligentiis (ca. 1230).

The new prominence given to light in medieval times had a powerful influence on all artistic genres, to the point that Daniel Boorstein points out that "it was the power of light that produced the most modern artistic forms, because light, the almost instantaneous messenger of sensation, is the swiftest and most transitory element". In addition to architecture, light had a special influence on the miniature, with manuscripts illuminated with bright and brilliant colors, generally thanks to the use of pure colors (white, red, blue, green, gold and silver), which gave the image a great luminosity, without shades or chiaroscuro. The conjugation of these elementary colors generates light by the overall concordance, thanks to the approximation of the inks, without having to resort to shading effects to outline the contours. The light radiates from the objects, which are luminous without the need for the play of volumes that will be characteristic of modern painting. In particular, the use of gold in medieval miniatures generated areas of great light intensity, often contrasted with cold and light tones, to provide greater chromaticism.

However, in painting, light did not have the prominence it had in architecture: medieval "proper light" was alien to reality and without contact with the spectator, since it neither came from outside — lacking a light source — nor went outward, since it did not expand light. Chiaroscuro was not used, since shadow was forbidden as it was considered a refuge for evil. Light was considered of divine origin and conqueror of darkness, so it illuminated everything equally, with the consequence of the lack of modeling and volume in the objects, a fact that resulted in the weightless and incorporeal image that was sought to emphasize spirituality. Although there is a greater interest in the representation of light, it is more symbolic than naturalistic. Just as in architecture the stained glass windows created a space where illumination took on a transcendent character, in painting a spatial staging was developed through gold backgrounds, which although they did not represent a physical space, they did represent a metaphysical realm, linked to the sacred. This "gothic light" was a feigned illumination and created a type of unreal image that transcended mere nature.

The gold background reinforced the sacred symbolism of light: the figures are immersed in an indeterminate space of unnatural light, a scenario of sacred character where figures and objects are part of the religious symbolism. Cennino Cennini (Il libro dell'Arte), compiled various technical procedures for the use of gold leaf in painting (backgrounds, draperies, nimbuses), which remained in force until the 16th century. Gold leaf was used profusely, especially in halos and backgrounds, as can be seen in Duccio's Maestà, which shone brightly in the interior of the cathedral of Siena. Sometimes, before applying the gold leaf, a layer of red clay was spread; after wetting the surface and placing the gold leaf, it was smoothed and polished with ivory or a smooth stone. To achieve more brilliance and to catch the light, incisions were made in the gilding. It is noteworthy that in early Gothic painting there are no shadows, but the entire representation is uniformly illuminated; according to Hans Jantzen, "to the extent that medieval painting suppresses the shadow, it raises its sensitive light to the power of a super-sensible light".

In Gothic painting there is a progressive evolution in the use of light: the linear or Franco-Gothic Gothic was characterized by linear drawing and strong chromaticism, and gave greater importance to the luminosity of flat color than to tonality, emphasizing chromatic pigment as opposed to luminous gradation. With the Italic or Trecentist Gothic a more naturalistic use of light began, characterized by the approach to the representation of depth — which would crystallize in the Renaissance with the linear perspective — the studies on anatomy and the analysis of light to achieve tonal nuance, as seen in the work of Cimabue, Giotto, Duccio, Simone Martini, and Ambrogio Lorenzetti. In the Flemish Gothic period, the technique of oil painting emerged, which provided brighter colors and allowed their gradation in different chromatic ranges, while facilitating greater detail in the details (Jan van Eyck, Rogier van der Weyden, Hans Memling, Gerard David).

Between the 13th and 14th centuries a new sensibility towards a more naturalistic representation of reality emerged in Italy, which had as one of its contributing factors the study of a realistic light in the pictorial composition. In the frescoes of the Scrovegni Chapel (Padua), Giotto studied how to distinguish flat and curved surfaces by the presence or absence of gradients and how to distinguish the orientation of flat surfaces by three tones: lighter for horizontal surfaces, medium for frontal vertical surfaces and darker for receding vertical surfaces. Giotto was the first painter to represent sunlight, a type of soft, transparent illumination, but one that already served to model figures and enhance the quality of clothes and objects. For his part, Taddeo Gaddi — in his Annunciation to the Shepherds (Baroncelli Chapel, Santa Croce, Florence) — depicted divine light in a night scene with a visible light source and a rapid fall in the pattern of light distribution characteristic of point sources of light, through contrasts of yellow and violet.

In the Netherlands, the brothers Hubert and Jan van Eyck and Robert Campin sought to capture various plays of light on surfaces of different textures and sheen, imitating the reflections of light on mirrors and metallic surfaces and highlighting the brilliance of colored jewels and gems (Triptych of Mérode, by Campin, 1425-1428; Polyptych of Ghent, by Hubert and Jan van Eyck, 1432). Hubert was the first to develop a certain sense of saturation of light in his Hours of Turin (1414-1417), in which he recreated the first "modern landscapes" of Western painting — according to Kenneth Clark. In these small landscapes the artist recreates effects such as the reflection of the evening sky on the water or the light sparkling on the waves of a lake, effects that would not be seen again until the Dutch landscape painting of the 17th century. In the Ghent Polyptych (1432, Saint Bavo's Cathedral, Ghent), by Hubert and Jan, the landscape of The Adoration of the Mystic Lamb melts into light in the celestial background, with a subtlety that only the Baroque Claude of Lorraine would later achieve.

Jan van Eyck developed the light experiments of his brother and managed to capture an atmospheric luminosity of naturalistic aspect in his works, in paintings such as The Virgin of Chancellor Rolin (1435, Louvre Museum, Paris), or The Arnolfini Marriage (1434, The National Gallery, London), where he combines the natural light that enters through two side windows with that of a single candle lit on the candlestick, which here has a more symbolic than plastic value, since it symbolizes human life. In Van Eyck's workshop, oil painting was developed, which gave a greater luminosity to the painting thanks to the glazes: in general, they applied a first layer of tempera, more opaque, on which they applied the oil (pigments ground in oil), which is more transparent, through several thin layers that let the light pass through, achieving greater luminosity, depth and tonal and chromatic richness.

Other Dutch artists who stood out in the expression of light were: Dirk Bouts, who in his works enhances with light the coloring and, in general, the plastic sense of the composition; Petrus Christus, whose use of light approaches a certain abstraction of the forms; and Geertgen tot Sint Jans, author in some of his works of surprising light effects, as in his Nativity (1490, National Gallery, London), where the light emanates from the body of the Child Jesus in the cradle, symbol of the Divine Grace.

Modern Age Art

Renaissance 

The art of the Modern Age — not to be confused with modern art, which is often used as a synonym for contemporary art — began with the Renaissance, which emerged in Italy in the 15th century (Quattrocento), a style influenced by classical Greco-Roman art and inspired by nature, with a more rational and measured component, based on harmony and proportion. Linear perspective emerged as a new method of composition and light became more naturalistic, with an empirical study of physical reality. Renaissance culture meant a return to rationalism, the study of nature, empirical research, with a special influence of classical Greco-Roman philosophy. Theology took a back seat and the object of study of the philosopher returned to the human being (humanism).

In the Renaissance, the use of canvas as a support and the technique of oil painting became widespread, especially in Venice from 1460. Oil painting provided a greater chromatic richness and facilitated the representation of brightness and light effects, which could be represented in a wider range of shades. In general, Renaissance light tended to be intense in the foreground, diminishing progressively towards the background. It was a fixed lighting, which meant an abstraction with respect to reality, since it created an aseptic space subordinated to the idealizing character of Renaissance painting; to reconvert this ideal space into a real atmosphere, a slow process was followed based on the subordination of volumetric values to lighting effects, through the dissolution of the solidity of forms in the luminous space.

During this period, chiaroscuro was recovered as a method to give relief to objects, while the study of gradation as a technique to diminish the intensity of color and modeling to graduate the different values of light and shadow was deepened. Renaissance natural light not only determined the space of the pictorial composition, but also the volume of figures and objects. It is a light that loses the metaphorical character of Gothic light and becomes a tool for measuring and ordering reality, shaping a plastic space through a naturalistic representation of light effects. Even when light retains a metaphorical reference — in religious scenes — it is a light subordinated to the realistic composition.

Light had a special relevance in landscape painting, a genre in which it signified the transition from a symbolic representation in medieval art to a naturalistic transcription of reality. Light is the medium that unifies all parts of the composition into a structured and coherent whole. According to Kenneth Clark, "the sun shines for the first time in the landscape of the Flight into Egypt that Gentile da Fabriano painted in his Adoration of 1423. This sun is a golden disk, which is reminiscent of medieval symbolism, but its light is already fully naturalistic, spilling over the hillside, casting shadows and creating the compositional space of the image.

In the Renaissance, the first theoretical treatises on the representation of light in painting appeared: Leonardo da Vinci dedicated a good part of his Treatise on Painting to the scientific study of light. Albrecht Dürer investigated a mathematical procedure to determine the location of shadows cast by objects illuminated by point source lights, such as candlelight. Giovanni Paolo Lomazzo devoted the fourth book of his Trattato (1584) to light, in which he arranged light in descending order from primary sunlight, divine light and artificial light to the weaker secondary light reflected by illuminated bodies. Cennino Cennini took up in his treatise Il libro dell'arte the rule of Philoponus on the creation of distance by contrasts: "the farther away you want the mountains to appear, the darker you will make your color; and the closer you want them to appear, the lighter you will make the colors".

Another theoretical reference was Leon Battista Alberti, who in his treatise De pictura (1435) pointed out the indissolubility of light and color, and affirmed that "philosophers say that no object is visible if it is not illuminated and has no color. Therefore they affirm that between light and color there is a great interdependence, since they make themselves reciprocally visible". In his treatise, Alberti pointed out three fundamental concepts in painting: circumscriptio (drawing, outline), compositio (arrangement of the elements), and luminum receptio (illumination). He stated that color is a quality of light and that to color is to "give light" to a painting. Alberti pointed out that relief in painting was achieved by the effects of light and shadow (lumina et umbrae), and warned that "on the surface on which the rays of light fall the color is lighter and more luminous, and that the color becomes darker where the strength of the light gradually diminishes." Likewise, he spoke of the use of white as the main tool for creating brilliance: "the painter has nothing but white pigment (album colorem) to imitate the flash (fulgorem) of the most polished surfaces, just as he has nothing but black to represent the most extreme darkness of the night. Thus, the darker the general tone of the painting, the more possibilities the artist has to create light effects, as they will stand out more.

Alberti's theories greatly influenced Florentine painting in the mid-15th century, so much so that this style is sometimes called pittura di luce (light painting), represented by Domenico Veneziano, Fra Angelico, Paolo Uccello, Andrea del Castagno and the early works of Piero della Francesca.

Domenico Veneziano, who as his name indicates was originally from Venice but settled in Florence, was the introducer of a style based more on color than on line. In one of his masterpieces, The Virgin and Child with Saint Francis, Saint John the Baptist, Saint Cenobius and Saint Lucy (c. 1445, Uffizi, Florence), he achieved a believably naturalistic representation by combining the new techniques of representing light and space. The solidity of the forms is solidly based on the light-shadow modeling, but the image also has a serene and radiant atmosphere that comes from the clear sunlight that floods the courtyard where the scene takes place, one of the stylistic hallmarks of this artist.

Fra Angelico synthesized the symbolism of the spiritual light of medieval Christianity with the naturalism of Renaissance scientific light. He knew how to distinguish between the light of dawn, noon and twilight, a diffuse and non-contrasting light, like an eternal spring, which gives his works an aura of serenity and placidity that reflects his inner spirituality. In Scenes from the Life of Saint Nicholas (1437, Pinacoteca Vaticana, Rome) he applied Alberti's method of balancing illuminated and shaded halves, especially in the figure with his back turned and the mountainous background.

Uccello was also a great innovator in the field of pictorial lighting: in his works — such as The Battle of San Romano (1456, Musée du Louvre, Paris) — each object is conceived independently, with its own lighting that defines its corporeality, in conjunction with the geometric values that determine its volume. These objects are grouped together in a scenographic composition, with a type of artificial lighting reminiscent of that of the performing arts.

In turn, Piero della Francesca used light as the main element of spatial definition, establishing a system of volumetric composition in which even the figures are reduced to mere geometric outlines, as in The Baptism of Christ (1440-1445, The National Gallery, London). According to Giulio Carlo Argan, Piero did not consider "a transmission of light, but a fixation of light", which turns the figures into references of a certain definition of space. He carried out scientific studies of perspective and optics (De prospectiva pingendi) and in his works, full of a colorful luminosity of great beauty, he uses light as both an expressive and symbolic element, as can be seen in his frescoes of San Francesco in Arezzo. Della Francesca was one of the first modern artists to paint night scenes, such as The Dream of Constantine (Legend of the Cross, 1452-1466, San Francesco in Arezzo). He cleverly assimilated the luminism of the Flemish school, which he combined with Florentine spatialism: in some of his landscapes there are luminous moonscapes reminiscent of the Van Eyck brothers, although transcribed with the golden Mediterranean light of his native Umbria.

Masaccio was a pioneer in using light to emphasize the drama of the scene, as seen in his frescoes in the Brancacci chapel of Santa Maria del Carmine (Florence), where he uses light to configure and model the volume, while the combination of light and shadow serves to determine the space. In these frescoes, Masaccio achieved a sense of perspective without resorting to geometry, as would be usual in linear perspective, but by distributing light among the figures and other elements of the representation. In The Tribute of the Coin, for example, he placed a light source outside the painting that illuminates the figures obliquely, casting shadows on the ground with which the artist plays.

Straddling the Gothic and Renaissance periods, Gentile da Fabriano was also a pioneer in the naturalistic use of light: in the predella of the Adoration of the Magi (1423, Uffizi, Florence) he distinguished between natural, artificial and supernatural light sources, using a technique of gold leaf and graphite to create the illusion of light through tonal modeling.

Sandro Botticelli was a Gothic painter who moved away from the naturalistic style initiated by Masaccio and returned to a certain symbolic concept of light. In The Birth of Venus (1483-1485, Uffizi, Florence), he symbolized the dichotomy between matter and spirit with the contrast between light and darkness, in line with the Neoplatonic theories of the Florentine Academy of which he was a follower: on the left side of the painting the light corresponds to the dawn, both physical and symbolic, since the female character that appears embracing Zephyrus is Aurora, the goddess of dawn; on the right side, darker, are the earth and the forest, as metaphorical elements of matter, while the character that tends a mantle to Venus is the Hour, which personifies time. Venus is in the center, between day and night, between sea and land, between the divine and the human.

A remarkable pictorial school emerged in Venice, characterized by the use of canvas and oil painting, where light played a fundamental role in the structuring of forms, while great importance was given to color: chromaticism would be the main hallmark of this school, as it would be in the 16th century with Mannerism. Its main representatives were Carlo Crivelli, Antonello da Messina, and Giovanni Bellini. In the Altarpiece of Saint Job (c. 1485, Gallerie dell'Accademia, Venice), Bellini brought together for the first time the Florentine linear perspective with Venetian color, combining space and atmosphere, and made the most of the new oil technique initiated in Flanders, thus creating a new artistic language that was quickly imitated. According to Kenneth Clark, Bellini "was born with the landscape painter's greatest gift: emotional sensitivity to light". In his Christ on the Mount of Olives (1459, National Gallery, London) he made the effects of light the driving force of the painting, with a shadowy valley in which the rising sun peeks through the hills. This emotive light is also seen in his Resurrection at the Staatliche Museen in Berlin (1475-1479), where the figure of Jesus radiates a light that bathes the sleeping soldiers. While his early works are dominated by sunrises and sunsets, in his mature production he appreciates more the full light of day, in which the forms merge with the general atmosphere. However, he also knew how to take advantage of the cold and pale lights of winter, as in the Virgin of the Meadow (1505, National Gallery, London), where a pale sun struggles with the shadows of the foreground, creating a fleeting effect of marble light.

The Renaissance saw the emergence of the sfumato technique, traditionally attributed to Leonardo da Vinci, which consisted of the degradation of light tones to blur the contours and thus give a sense of remoteness. This technique was intended to give greater verisimilitude to the pictorial representation, by creating effects similar to those of human vision in environments with a wide perspective. The technique consisted of a progressive application of glazes and the feathering of the shadows to achieve a smooth gradient between the various parts of light and shadow of the painting, with a tonal gradation achieved with progressive retouching, leaving no trace of the brushstroke. It is also called "aerial perspective", since its results resemble the vision in a natural environment determined by atmospheric and environmental effects. This technique was used, in addition to Leonardo, by Dürer, Giorgione and Bernardino Luini, and later by Velázquez and other Baroque painters.

Leonardo was essentially concerned with perception, the observation of nature. He sought life in painting, which he found in color, in the light of chromaticism. In his Treatise on Painting (1540) he stated that painting is the sum of light and darkness (chiaroscuro), which gives movement, life: according to Leonardo, darkness is the body and light is the spirit, and the mixture of both is life. In his treatise he established that "painting is a composition of light and shadows, combined with the various qualities of all the simple and compound colors". He also distinguished between illumination (lume) and brilliance (lustro), and warned that "opaque bodies with hard and rough surface never generate luster in any illuminated part".

The Florentine polymath included light among the main components of painting and pointed it out as an element that articulates pictorial representation and conditions the spatial structure and the volume and chromaticism of objects and figures. He was also concerned with the study of shadows and their effects, which he analyzed together with light in his treatise. He also distinguished between shadow (ombra) and darkness (tenebre), the former being an oscillation between light and darkness. He also studied nocturnal painting, for which he recommended the presence of fire as a means of illumination, and he wrote down the different necessary gradations of light and color according to the distance from the light source. Leonardo was one of the first artists to be concerned with the degree of illumination of the painter's studio, suggesting that for nudes or carnations the studio should have uncovered lights and red walls, while for portraits the walls should be black and the light diffused by a canopy.

Leonardo's subtle chiaroscuro effects are perceived in his female portraits, in which the shadows fall on the faces as if submerging them in a subtle and mysterious atmosphere. In these works he advocated intermediate lights, stating that "the contours and figures of dark bodies are poorly distinguished in the dark as well as in the light, but in the intermediate zones between light and shadow they are better perceived". Likewise, on color he wrote that "colors placed in shadows will participate to a greater or lesser degree in their natural beauty according as they are placed in greater or lesser darkness. But if the colors are placed in a luminous space, then they will possess a beauty all the greater the more splendorous the luminosity".

The other great name of the early Cinquecento was Raphael, a serene and balanced artist whose work shows a certain idealism framed in a realistic technique of great virtuoso execution. According to Giovanni Paolo Lomazzo, Raphael "has given enchanting, loving and sweet light, so that his figures appear beautiful, pleasing and intricate in their contours, and endowed with such relief that they seem to move." Some of his lighting solutions were quite innovative, with resources halfway between Leonardo and Caravaggio, as seen in The Transfiguration (1517-1520, Vatican Museums, Vatican City), in which he divides the image into two halves, the heavenly and the earthly, each with different pictorial resources. In the Liberation of Saint Peter (1514, Vatican Museums, Vatican City) he painted a nocturnal scene in which the light radiating from the angel in the center stands out, giving a sensation of depth, while at the same time it is reflected in the breastplates of the guards, creating intense luminous effects. This was perhaps the first work to include artificial lighting with a naturalistic sense: the light radiating from the angel influences the illumination of the surrounding objects, while diluting the distant forms.

Outside Italy, Albrecht Dürer was especially concerned with light in his watercolor landscapes, treated with an almost topographical detail, in which he shows a special delicacy in the capture of light, with poetic effects that prelude the sentimental landscape of Romanticism. Albrecht Altdorfer showed a surprising use of light in The Battle of Alexander at Issos (1529, Alte Pinakothek, Munich), where the appearance of the sun among the clouds produces a supernatural refulgence, effects of bubbling lights that also precede Romanticism. Matthias Grünewald was a solitary and melancholic artist, whose original work reflects a certain mysticism in the treatment of religious themes, with an emotive and expressionist style, still with medieval roots. His main work was the altar of Isenheim (1512-1516, Museum Unterlinden, Colmar), in which the refulgent halo in which he places his Risen Christ stands out.

Between Gothic and Renaissance is the unclassifiable work of Bosch, a Flemish artist gifted with a great imagination, author of dreamlike images that continue to surprise for their fantasy and originality. In his works — and especially in his landscape backgrounds — there is a great skill in the use of light in different temporal and environmental circumstances, but he also knew how to recreate in his infernal scenes fantastic effects of flames and fires, as well as supernatural lights and other original effects, especially in works such as The Last Judgment (c. 1486-1510, Groenige Museum, Bruges), Visions of the Beyond (c. 1490, Doge's Palace, Venice), The Garden of Earthly Delights (c. 1500-1505, Museo del Prado, Madrid), The Hay Chariot (c. 1500-1502, Museo del Prado, Madrid) or The Temptations of Saint Anthony (c. 1501, Museum of Fine Arts, Lisbon). Bosch had a predilection for the effects of light generated by fire, by the glow of flames, which gave rise to a new series of paintings in which the effects of violent and fantastic lights originated by fire stood out, as is denoted in a work by an anonymous artist linked to the workshop of Lucas van Leyden, Lot and his daughters (c. 1530, Musée du Louvre, Paris), or in some works by Joachim Patinir, such as Charon crossing the Styx Lagoon (c. 1520-1524, Museo del Prado, Madrid) or Landscape with the Destruction of Sodom and Gomorrah (c. 1520, Boymans Van Beuningen Museum, Rotterdam). These effects also influenced Giorgione, as well as some Mannerist painters such as Lorenzo Lotto, Dosso Dossi and Domenico Beccafumi.

Mannerism 

At the end of the High Renaissance, in the middle of the 16th century, Mannerism followed, a movement that abandoned nature as a source of inspiration to seek a more emotional and expressive tone, in which the artist's subjective interpretation of the work of art became more important, with a taste for sinuous and stylized form, with deformation of reality, distorted perspectives and gimmicky atmospheres. In this style light was used in a gimmicky way, with an unreal treatment, looking for a colored light of different origins, both a cold moonlight and a warm firelight. Mannerism broke with the full Renaissance light by introducing night scenes with intense chromatic interplay between light and shadow and a dynamic rhythm far from Renaissance harmony. Mannerist light, in contrast to Renaissance classicism, took on a more expressive function, with a natural origin but an unreal treatment, a disarticulating factor of the classicist balance, as seen in the work of Pontormo, Rosso or Beccafumi.

In Mannerism, the Renaissance optical scheme of light and shadow was broken by suppressing the visual relationship between the light source and the illuminated parts of the painting, as well as in the intermediate steps of gradation. The result was strong contrasts of color and chiaroscuro, and an artificial and refulgent aspect of the illuminated parts, independent of the light source.

Between Renaissance classicism and Mannerism lies the work of Michelangelo, one of the most renowned artists of universal stature. His use of light was generally with plastic criteria, but sometimes he used it as a dramatic resource, especially in his frescoes in the Pauline Chapel: Crucifixion of Saint Peter and Conversion of Saint Paul (1549). Placed on opposite walls, the artist valued the entry of natural light into the chapel, which illuminated one wall and left the other in semi-darkness: in the darkest part he placed the Crucifixion, a subject more suitable for the absence of light, which emphasizes the tragedy of the scene, intensified in its symbolic aspect by the fading light of dusk that is perceived on the horizon; instead, the Conversion receives natural light, but at the same time the pictorial composition has more luminosity, especially for the powerful ray of light that comes from the hand of Christ and is projected on the figure of Saul, who thanks to this divine intervention is converted to Christianity.

Another reference of Mannerism was Correggio, the first artist —according to Vasari — to apply a dark tone in contrast to light to produce effects of depth, while masterfully developing the Leonardoesque sfumato through diffuse lights and gradients. In his work The Nativity (1522, Gemäldegalerie Alte Meister, Dresden) he was the first to show the birth of Jesus as a "miracle of light", an assimilation that would become habitual from then on. In The Assumption of the Virgin (1526-1530), painted on the dome of the cathedral of Parma, he created an illusionistic effect with figures seen from below (sotto in sù) that would be the forerunner of Baroque optical illusionism; in this work the subtle nuances of his flesh tones stand out, as well as the luminous break of glory of its upper part.

Jacopo Pontormo, a disciple of Leonardo, developed a strongly emotional, dynamic style with unreal effects of space and scale, in which a great mastery of color and light can be glimpsed, applied by color stains, especially red. Domenico Beccafumi stood out for his colorism, fantasy and unusual light effects, as in The Birth of the Virgin (1543, Pinacoteca Nazionale di Siena). Rosso Fiorentino also developed an unusual coloring and fanciful play of light and shadow, as in his Descent of Christ (1521, Pinacoteca Comunale, Volterra). Luca Cambiasso showed a great interest in nocturnal illumination, which is why he is considered a forerunner of tenebrism. Bernardino Luini, a disciple of Leonardo, showed a Leonardoesque treatment of light in the Madonna of the Rosebush (c. 1525-1530, Pinacoteca di Brera).

Alongside this more whimsical mannerism, a school of a more serene style emerged in Venice that stood out for its treatment of light, which subordinated plastic form to luminous values, as can be seen in the work of Giorgione, Titian, Tintoretto and Veronese. In this school, light and color were fused, and Renaissance linear perspective was replaced by aerial perspective, the use of which would culminate in the Baroque. The technique used by these Venetian painters is called "tonalism": it consisted in the superimposition of glazes to form the image through the modulation of color and light, which are harmonized through relations of tone modulating them in a space of plausible appearance. The color assumes the function of light and shadow, and it is the chromatic relationships that create the effects of volume. In this modality, the chromatic tone depends on the intensity of light and shadow (the color value).
Giorgione brought the Leonardesque influence to Venice. He was an original artist, one of the first to specialize in cabinet paintings for private collectors, and the first to subordinate the subject of the work to the evocation of moods. Vasari considered him, together with Leonardo, one of the founders of "modern painting". A great innovator, he reformulated landscape painting both in composition and iconography, with images conceived in depth with a careful modulation of chromatic and light values, as is evident in one of his masterpieces, The Tempest (1508, Gallerie dell'Accademia, Venice).Titian was a virtuoso in the recreation of vibrant atmospheres with subtle shades of light achieved with infinite variations obtained after a meticulous study of reality and a skillful handling of the brushes that demonstrated a great technical mastery. In his Pentecost (1546, Santa Maria della Salute, Venice) he made rays of light emanate from the dove representing the Holy Spirit, ending in tongues of fire on the heads of the Virgin and the apostles, with surprising light effects that were innovative for his time. This research gradually evolved into increasingly dramatic effects, giving more emphasis to artificial lighting, as seen in The Martyrdom of Saint Lawrence (1558, Jesuit Church, Venice), where he combines the light of the torches and the fire of the grill where the saint is martyred with the supernatural effect of a powerful flash of divine light in the sky that is projected on the figure of the saint. This experimentation with light influenced the work of artists such as Veronese, Tintoretto, Jacopo Bassano and El Greco.
Tintoretto liked to paint enclosed in his studio with the windows closed by the light of candles and torches, which is why his paintings are often called di notte e di fuoco ("by night and fire"). In his works, of deep atmospheres, with thin and vertical figures, the violent effects of artificial lights stand out, with strong chiaroscuro and phosphorescent effects. These luminous effects were adopted by other members of the Venetian school such as the Bassano (Jacopo, Leandro, and Francesco), as well as by the so-called "Lombard illuminists" (Giovanni Girolamo Savoldo, Moretto da Brescia), while influencing El Greco and Baroque tenebrism.

Another artist framed in the painting di notte e di fuoco was Jacopo Bassano, whose indirect incidence lights influenced Baroque naturalism. In works such as Christ in the House of Mary, Martha and Lazarus (c. 1577, Museum of Fine Arts, Houston), he combined natural and artificial lights with striking lighting effects.

For his part, Paolo Veronese was heir to the luminism of Giovanni Bellini and Vittore Carpaccio, in scenes of Palladian architecture with dense morning lights, golden and warm, without prominent shadows, emphasizing the brightness of fabrics and jewels. In Allegory of the Battle of Lepanto (1571) he divided the scene into two halves, the battle below and the Virgin with the saints who ask for her favor for the battle at the top, where angels are placed, throwing lightning bolts towards the battle, creating spectacular lighting effects.

Outside Italy it is worth mentioning the work of Pieter Brueghel the Elder, author of costumist scenes and landscapes that denote a great sensitivity towards nature. In some of his works the influence of Hieronymous Bosch can be seen in his fire lights and fantastic effects, as in The Triumph of Death (c. 1562, Museo del Prado, Madrid). In some of his landscapes he added the sun as a direct source of luminosity, such as the yellow sun of The Flemish Proverbs (1559, Staatliche Museen, Berlin), the red winter sun of The Census in Bethlehem (1556, Royal Museums of Fine Arts of Belgium, Brussels) or the evening sun of Landscape with the Fall of Icarus (c. 1558, Royal Museums of Fine Arts of Belgium, Brussels).

El Greco worked in Spain during this period, a singular painter who developed an individual style, marked by the influence of the Venetian school, the city where he lived for a time, as well as Michelangelo, from whom he took his conception of the human figure. In El Greco's work, light always prevails over shadows, as a clear symbolism of the preeminence of faith over unbelief. In one of his first works from Toledo, the Expolio for the sacristy of the cathedral of Toledo (1577), a zenithal light illuminates the figure of Jesus, focusing on his face, which becomes the focus of light in the painting. In the Trinity of the church of Santo Domingo el Antiguo (1577-1580) he introduced a dazzling Gloria light of an intense golden yellow. In The Martyrdom of Saint Maurice (1580-1582, Royal Monastery of San Lorenzo de El Escorial) he created two areas of differentiated light: the natural light that surrounds the earthly characters and that of the breaking of the glory in the sky, furrowed with angels. Among his last works stands out The Adoration of the Shepherds (1612-1613, Museo del Prado, Madrid), where the focus of light is the Child Jesus, who radiates his luminosity around producing phosphorescent effects of strong chromatism and luminosity.

El Greco's illumination evolved from the light coming from a specific point —or in a diffuse way — of the Venetian school to a light rooted in Byzantine art, in which the figures are illuminated without a specific light source or even a diffuse light. It is an unnatural light, which can come from multiple sources or none at all, an arbitrary and unequal light that produces hallucinatory effects. El Greco had a plastic conception of light: his execution went from dark to light tones, finally applying touches of white that created shimmering effects. The refulgent aspect of his works was achieved through glazes, while the whites were finished with almost dry applications. His light is mystical, subjective, almost spectral in appearance, with a taste for shimmering gleams and incandescent reflections.

Barroco 

In the 17th century, the Baroque emerged, a more refined and ornamented style, with the survival of a certain classicist rationalism but with more dynamic and dramatic forms, with a taste for the surprising and the anecdotal, for optical illusions and the effect blows. Baroque painting had a marked geographical differentiating accent, since its development took place in different countries, in various national schools, each with a distinctive stamp. However, there is a common influence coming again from Italy, where two opposing trends emerged: naturalism (also called caravagism), based on the imitation of natural reality, with a certain taste for chiaroscuro — the so-called tenebrism — and classicism, which is just as realistic but with a more intellectual and idealized concept of reality. Later, in the so-called "full baroque" (second half of the 17th and early 18th centuries), painting evolved to a more decorative style, with a predominance of mural painting and a certain predilection for optical effects (trompe-l'œil) and luxurious and exuberant scenographies.

During this period, many scientific studies on light were carried out (Johannes Kepler, Francesco Maria Grimaldi, Isaac Newton, Christiaan Huygens, Robert Boyle), which influenced its pictorial representation. Newton proved that color comes from the spectrum of white light and designed the first chromatic circle showing the relationships between colors. In this period the maximum degree of perfection was reached in the pictorial representation of light and the tactile form was diluted in favor of a greater visual impression, achieved by giving greater importance to light, losing the form the accuracy of its contours. In the Baroque, light was studied for the first time as a system of composition, articulating it as a regulating element of the painting: light fulfills several functions, such as symbolic, modeling and illumination, and begins to be directed as an emphatic element, selective of the part of the painting to be highlighted, so that artificial light becomes more important, which can be manipulated at the free will of the artist. Sacred light (nimbus, haloes) was abandoned and natural light was used exclusively, even as a symbolic element. On the other hand, the light of different times of the day (morning, twilight) began to be distinguished. Illumination was conceived as a luminous unit, as opposed to the multiple sources of Renaissance light; in the Baroque there may be several sources, but they are circumscribed to a global and unitary sense of the work.

In the Baroque, the nocturne genre became fashionable, which implies a special difficulty in terms of the representation of light, due to the absence of daylight, so that on numerous occasions it was necessary to resort to chiaroscuro and lighting effects from artificial light, while the natural light should come from the moon or the stars. For artificial light, bonfires, candles, lanterns, lanterns, candles, fireworks or similar elements were used. These light sources could be direct or indirect, they could appear in the painting or illuminate the scene from outside.

Naturalism 

Chiaroscuro resurfaced during the Baroque, especially in the Counter-Reformation, as a method of focusing the viewer's vision on the primordial parts of religious paintings, which were emphasized as didactic elements, as opposed to the Renaissance "pictorial decor". An exacerbated variant of chiaroscuro was tenebrism, a technique based on strong contrasts of light and shadow, with a violent type of lighting, generally artificial, which gives greater prominence to the illuminated areas, on which a powerful focus of directed light is placed. These effects have a strong dramatism, which emphasizes the scenes represented, generally of religious type, although they also abound in mythological scenes, still lifes or vanitas. One of its main representatives was Caravaggio, as well as Orazio and Artemisia Gentileschi, Bartolomeo Manfredi, Carlo Saraceni, Giovanni Battista Caracciolo, Pieter van Laer (il Bamboccio), Adam Elsheimer, Gerard van Honthorst, Georges de La Tour, Valentin de Boulogne, the Le Nain brothers and José de Ribera (lo Spagnoletto).

Caravaggio was a pioneer in the dramatization of light, in scenes set in dark interiors with strong spotlights of directed light that used to emphasize one or more characters. With this painter, light acquired a structural character in painting, since, together with drawing and color, it would become one of its indispensable elements. He was influenced by Leonardo's chiaroscuro through The Virgin of the Rocks, which he was able to contemplate in the church of San Francesco il Grande in Milan. For Caravaggio, light served to configure the space, controlling its direction and expressive force. He was aware of the artist's power to shape the space at will, so in the composition of a work he would previously establish which lighting effects he was going to use, generally opting for sharp contrasts between the figures and the background, with darkness as a starting point: the figures emerge from the dark background and it is the light that determines their position and their prominence in the scene represented. Caravaggiesque light is conceptual, not imitative or symbolic, so it transcends materiality and becomes something substantial. It is a projected and solid light, which constitutes the basis of its spatial conception and becomes another volume in space.

His main hallmark in depicting light was the diagonal entry of light, which he first used in Boy with a Basket of Fruit (1593-1594, Galleria Borghese, Rome). In La bonaventure (1595-1598, Musée du Louvre, Paris) he used a warm golden light of the sunset, which falls directly on the young man and obliquely on the gypsy woman. His pictorial maturity came with the canvases for the Contarelli chapel in the church of San Luigi dei Francesi in Rome (1599-1600): The Martyrdom of Saint Matthew and The Vocation of Saint Matthew. In the first, he established a composition formed by two diagonals defined by the illuminated planes and the shadows that form the volume of the figures, in a complex composition cohesive thanks to the light, which relates the figures to each other. In the second, a powerful beam of light that enters diagonally from the upper right directly illuminates the figure of Matthew, a beam parallel to the raised arm of Jesus and that seems to accompany his gesture; an open shutter of the central window cuts this beam of light at the top, leaving the left side of the image in semi-darkness. In works such as the Crucifixion of Saint Peter and the Conversion of Saint Paul (1600-1601, Cerasi Chapel, Santa Maria del Popolo, Rome) light makes objects and people glow, to the point that it becomes the true protagonist of the works; these scenes are immersed in light in a way that constitutes more than a simple attribute of reality, but rather the medium through which reality manifests itself. In the final stage of his career he accentuated the dramatic tension of his works through a luminism of flashing effects, as in Seven Works of Mercy (1607, Pio Monte della Misericordia, Naples), a nocturne with several spotlights of light that help to emphasize the acts of mercy depicted in simultaneous action.

Artemisia Gentileschi trained with her father, Orazio Gentileschi, coinciding with the years when Caravaggio lived in Rome, whose work she could appreciate in San Luigi dei Francesi and Santa Maria del Popolo. His work was channeled in the tenebrist naturalism, assuming its most characteristic features: expressive use of light and chiaroscuro, dramatism of the scenes and figures of round anatomy. His most famous work is Judith beheading Holofernes (two versions: 1612-1613, Museo Capodimonte, Naples; and 1620, Uffizi, Florence), where the light focuses on Judith, her maid and the Assyrian general, against a complete darkness, emphasizing the drama of the scene. In the 1630s, established in Naples, his style adopted a more classicist component, without completely abandoning naturalism, with more diaphanous spaces and clearer and sharper atmospheres, although chiaroscuro remained an essential part of the composition, as a means to create space, give volume and expressiveness to the image. One of his best compositions due to the complexity of its lighting is The Birth of Saint John the Baptist (1630, Museo del Prado, Madrid), where he mixes natural and artificial light: the light from the portal in the upper right part of the painting softens the light inside the room, in a "subtle transition of light values" — according to Roberto Longhi — that would later become common in Dutch painting.

Adam Elsheimer was noted for his light studies of landscape painting, with an interest in dawn and dusk lights, as well as night lighting and atmospheric effects such as mists and fogs. His light was strange and intense, with an enamel-like appearance typical of German painting, in a tradition ranging from Lukas Moser to Albrecht Altdorfer. His most famous painting is Flight into Egypt (1609, Alte Pinakothek, Munich), a night scene that is considered the first moonlit landscape; four sources of light are visible in this work: the shepherds' bonfire, the torch carried by Saint Joseph, the moon and its reflection in the water; the Milky Way can also be perceived, whose representation can also be considered as the first one done in a naturalistic way.

Georges de La Tour was a magnificent interpreter of artificial light, generally lamp or candle lights, with a visible and precise focus, which he used to place inside the image, emphasizing its dramatic aspect. Sometimes, in order not to dazzle, the characters placed their hands in front of the candle, creating translucent effects on the skin, which acquired a reddish tone, of great realism and that proved his virtuosity in capturing reality. While his early works show the influence of Italian Caravaggism, from his stay in Paris between 1636 and 1643 he came closer to Dutch Caravaggism, more prone to the direct inclusion of the light source on the canvas. He thus began his most tenebrist period, with scenes of strong half-light where the light, generally from a candle, illuminates with greater or lesser intensity certain areas of the painting. In general, two types of composition can be distinguished: the fully visible light source (Job with his wife, Musée Départemental des Vosges, Épinal; Woman spurring herself, Musée Historique Lorrain, Nancy; Madeleine Terff, Musée du Louvre, Paris) or the light blocked by an object or character, creating a backlit illumination (Madeleine Fabius, Fabius collection, Paris; Angel appearing to Saint Joseph, Musée des Beaux-Arts, Nantes; The Adoration of the Shepherds, Musée du Louvre, Paris). In his later works he reduces the characters to schematic figures of geometric appearance, like mannequins, to fully recreate the effects of light on masses and surfaces (The Repentance of Saint Peter, Museum of Art, Cleveland; The Newborn, Musée des Beaux-Arts, Rennes; Saint Sebastian cured by Saint Irene, parish church of Broglie).

Despite its plausible appearance, La Tour's lighting is not fully naturalistic, but is sifted by the artist's will; at all times he prints the desired amount of light and shadow to recreate the desired effect; in general, it is a serene and diffuse lighting, which brings out the volume without excessive drama. The light serves to unite the figures, to highlight the part of the painting that best suits the plot of the work, it is a timeless light of a poetic, transcendent character; it is just the right light necessary to provide credibility, but it serves a more symbolic than realistic purpose. It is an unreal light, since no candle generates such a serene and diffuse light, a conceptual and stylistic light, which serves only the compositional intention of the painter.

Another French Caravaggist was Trophime Bigot, nicknamed Maître à la chandelle (Master of the candle) for his scenes of artificial light, in which he showed great expertise in the technique of chiaroscuro.

The Valencian artist José de Ribera (nicknamed lo Spagnoletto), who lived in Naples, fully assumed the Caravaggesque light, with an anti-idealist style of pasty brushstrokes and dynamic effects of movement. Ribera assumed the tenebrist illumination in a personal way, sifted by other influences, such as Venetian coloring or the compositional rigor of Bolognese classicism. In his early work he used the violent contrasts of light and shadow characteristic of tenebrism, but from the 1630s he evolved to a greater chromaticism and clearer and more diaphanous backgrounds. In contrast to the flat painting of Caravaggio, Ribera used a dense paste that gave more volume and emphasized the brightness. One of his best works, Sileno ebrio (1626, Museum of Capodimonte, Naples) stands out for the flashes of light that illuminate the various characters, with special emphasis on the naked body of the Sileno, illuminated by a flat light of morbid appearance.

In addition to Ribera, in Spain, Caravaggism had the figure of Juan Bautista Maíno, a Dominican friar who was drawing teacher of Philip IV, resident in Rome between 1598 and 1612, where he was a disciple of Annibale Carracci; his work stands out for its colorism and luminosity, as in The Adoration of the Shepherds (1611-1613, Museo del Prado, Madrid). Also noteworthy is the work of the still life painters Juan Sánchez Cotán and Juan van der Hamen. In general, Spanish naturalism treated light with a sense close to Caravaggism, but with a certain sensuality coming from the Venetian school and a detailing with Flemish roots. Francisco de Zurbarán developed a somewhat sweetened tenebrism, although one of his best works, San Hugo in the refectory of the Carthusian monks (c. 1630, Museo de Bellas Artes de Sevilla) stands out for the presence of white color, with a subtle play of light and shadow that stands out for the multiplicity of intensities applied to each figure and object.

In Venice, Baroque painting did not produce such exceptional figures as in the Renaissance and Mannerism, but in the work of artists such as Domenico Fetti, Johann Liss, and Bernardo Strozzi one can perceive the vibrant luminism and the enveloping atmospheres so characteristic of Venetian painting.

The Caravaggist novelties had a special echo in Holland, where the so-called Caravaggist School of Utrecht emerged, a series of painters who assumed the description of reality and the chiaroscuro effects of Caravaggio as pictorial principles, on which they developed a new style based on tonal chromaticism and the search for new compositional schemes, resulting in a painting that stands out for its optical values. Among its members were Hendrik Terbrugghen, Dirck van Baburen, and Gerard van Honthorst, all three trained in Rome. The first assumed the thematic repertoire of Caravaggio but with a more sweetened tone, with a sharp drawing, a grayish-silver chromatism and an atmosphere of soft light clarity. Van Baburen sought full light effects rather than chiaroscuro contrasts, with intense volumes and contours. Honthorst was a skillful producer of night scenes, which earned him the nickname Gherardo delle Notti ("Gerard of the Nights"). In works such as Christ before the High Priest (1617), Nativity (1622), The Prodigal Son (1623) or The Procuress (1625), he showed great mastery in the use of artificial light, generally from candles, with one or two light sources that illuminated the scene unevenly, highlighting the most significant parts of the painting and leaving the rest in semi-darkness. Of his Christ on the Column, Joachim von Sandrart said: "the brightness of the candles and lights illuminates everything with a naturalness that resembles life so closely that no art has ever reached such heights".

One of the greatest exponents of the symbolic use of light was Rembrandt, an original artist with a strong personal stamp, with a style close to tenebrism but more diffused, without the marked contrasts between light and shadow typical of the Caravaggists, but a more subtle and diffuse penumbra. According to Giovanni Arpino, Rembrandt "invented light, not as heat, but as value. He invented light not to illuminate, but to make his world unapproachable". In general, he elaborated images where darkness predominated, illuminated in certain parts of the scene by a ray of zenithal light of divine connotation; if the light is inside the painting it means that the world is circumscribed to the illuminated part and nothing exists outside this light. Rembrandtian light is a reflection of an external force, which affects the objects causing them to radiate energy, like the retransmission of a message. Although he starts from tenebrism, his contrasts of light and shadow are not as sharp as those of Caravaggio, but he likes more a kind of golden shadows that give a mysterious air to his paintings. In Rembrandt, light was something structural, integrated in form, color and space, in such a way that it dematerializes bodies and plays with the texture of objects. It is a light that is not subject to the laws of physics, which he generally concentrates in one area of the painting, creating a glowing luminosity. In his work, light and shadow interact, dissolving the contours and deforming the forms, which become the sustaining object of the light. According to Wolfgang Schöne, in Rembrandt light and darkness are actually two types of light, one bright and the other dark. He used to use a canvas as a reflecting or diffusing screen, which he regulated as he wished to obtain the desired illumination in each scene. His concern for light led him not only to his pictorial study, but also to establish the correct placement of his paintings for optimal visualization; thus, in 1639 he advised Constantijn Huygens on the placement of his painting Samson blinded by the Philistines: "hang this painting where there is strong light, so that it can be seen from a certain distance, and thus it will have the best effect". Rembrandt also masterfully captured light in his etchings, such as The Hundred Florins and The Three Crosses, in which light is almost the protagonist of the scene.

Rembrandt picked up the luminous tradition of the Venetian school, as did his compatriot Johannes Vermeer, although while the former stands out for his fantastic effects of light, the latter develops in his work a luminosity of great quality in the local tones. Vermeer imprinted his works — generally everyday scenes in interior spaces — with a pale luminosity that created placid and calm atmospheres. He used a technique called pointillé, a series of dots of pigment with which he enhanced the objects, on which he often applied a luminosity that made the surfaces reflect the light in a special way. Vermeer's light softens the contours without losing the solidity of the forms, in a combination of softness and precision that few other artists have achieved.

Nicknamed the "painter of light", Vermeer masterfully synthesized light and color, he knew how to capture the color of light like no one else. In his works, light is itself a color, while shadow is inextricably linked to light. Vermeer's light is always natural, he does not like artificial light, and generally has a tone close to lemon yellow, which together with the dull blue and light gray were the main colors of his palette. It is the light that forms the figures and objects, and in conjunction with the color is what fixes the forms. As for the shadows, they are interspersed in the light, reversing the contrast: instead of fitting the luminous part of the painting into the shadows, it is the shadows that are cut out of the luminous space. Contrary to the practice of chiaroscuro, in which the form is progressively lost in the half-light, Vermeer placed a foreground of dark color to increase the tonal intensity, which reaches its zenith in the middle light; from here he dissolves the color towards white, instead of towards black as was done in chiaroscuro. In Vermeer's work, the painting is an organized structure through which light circulates, is absorbed and diffused by the objects that appear on the scene. He builds the forms thanks to the harmony between light and color, which is saturated, with a predominance of pure colors and cold tones. The light gives visual existence to the space, which in turn receives and diffuses it.

Other prominent Dutch painters were Frans Hals and Jacob Jordaens. The former had a Caravaggist phase between 1625 and 1630, with a clear chromaticism and diffuse luminosity (The Merry Drinker, 1627-1628, Rijksmuseum, Amsterdam; Malle Babbe, 1629-1630, Gemäldegalerie, Berlin), to evolve later to a more sober, dark and monochromatic style. Jordaens had a style characterized by a bright and fantastic coloring, with strong contrasts of light and shadow and a technique of dense impasto. Between 1625 and 1630 he had a period in which he deepened the luminous values of his images, in works such as The Martyrdom of Saint Apollonia (1628, Church of Saint Augustine, Antwerp) or The Fecundity of the Earth (1630, Royal Museums of Fine Arts of Belgium, Brussels).

One should also mention Godfried Schalcken, a disciple of Gerard Dou who worked not only in his native country but also in England and Germany. An excellent portraitist, in many of his works he used artificial candlelight or candle light, influenced by Rembrandt, as in Portrait of William III (1692-1697, Rijksmuseum, Amsterdam), Portrait of James Stuart, Duke of Lennox and Richmond (1692-1696, Leiden Collection, New York), Young Man and Woman Studying a Statue of Venus by Lamplight (c. 1690, Leiden Collection, New York) or Old Man Reading by Candlelight (c. 1700, Museo del Prado, Madrid).

A genre that flourished in Holland in an exceptional way in this century was landscape painting, which, in line with the mannerist landscape painting of Pieter Brueghel the Elder and Joos de Momper, developed a new sensitivity to atmospheric effects and the reflections of the sun on water. Jan van Goyen was its first representative, followed by artists such as Salomon van Ruysdael, Jacob van Ruysdael, Meindert Hobbema, Aelbert Cuyp, Jan van de Cappelle and Adriaen van de Velde. Salomon van Ruysdael sought atmospheric capture, which he treated by tonalities, studying the light of different times of the day. His nephew Jacob van Ruysdael was endowed with a great sensitivity for natural vision, and his depressive character led him to elaborate images of great expressiveness, where the play of light and shadow accentuated the drama of the scene. His light is not the saturating and static light of the Renaissance, but a light in movement, perceptible in the effects of light and shadow in the clouds and their reflections in the plains, a light that led John Constable to formulate one of his lessons on art: "remember that light and shadow never stand still". His assistant was Meindert Hobbema, from whom he differed in his chromatic contrasts and lively light effects, which reveal a certain nervousness of stroke. Aelbert Cuyp used a much lighter palette than his compatriots, with a warmer and more golden light, probably influenced by Jan Both's "Italianate landscape". He stood out for his atmospheric effects, for the detail of the light reflections on objects or landscape elements, for the use of elongated shadows and for the use of the sun's rays diagonally and backlit, in line with the stylistic novelties produced in Italy, especially around the figure of Claudius of Lorraine.

Another genre that flourished in Holland was the still life. One of its best representatives was Willem Kalf, author of still lifes of great precision in detail, which combined flowers, fruits and other foods with various objects generally of luxury, such as vases, Turkish carpets and bowls of Chinese porcelain, which emphasize their play of light and shadow and the bright reflections in the metallic and crystalline surfaces.

Classicism and full Baroque 

Classicism emerged in Bologna, around the so-called Bolognese School, initiated by the brothers Annibale and Agostino Carracci. This trend was a reaction against mannerism, which sought an idealized representation of nature, representing it not as it is, but as it should be. It pursued the ideal beauty as its sole objective, for which it was inspired by classical Greco-Roman and Renaissance art. This ideal found an ideal subject of representation in the landscape, as well as in historical and mythological themes. In addition to the Carracci brothers, Guido Reni, Domenichino, Francesco Albani, Guercino and Giovanni Lanfranco stood out.

In the classicist trend, the use of light is paramount in the composition of the painting, although with slight nuances depending on the artist: from the Incamminati and the Academy of Bologna (Carracci brothers), Italian classicism split into several currents: one moved more towards decorativism, with the use of light tones and shiny surfaces, where the lighting is articulated in large luminous spaces (Guido Reni, Lanfranco, Guercino); another specialized in landscape painting and, starting from the Carracci influence — mainly the frescoes of Palazzo Aldobrandini — developed along two parallel lines: the first focused more on classical-style composition, with a certain scenographic character in the arrangement of landscapes and figures (Poussin, Domenichino); the other is represented by Claudio da Lorena, with a more lyrical component and greater concern for the representation of light, not only as a plastic factor but as an agglutinating element of a harmonious conception of the work.

Claudio de Lorena was one of the baroque painters who best knew how to represent light in his works, to which he gave a primordial importance at the time of conceiving the painting: the light composition served firstly as a plastic factor, being the basis with which he organized the composition, with which he created space and time, with which he articulated the figures, the architectures, the elements of nature; secondly, it was an aesthetic factor, highlighting light as the main sensitive element, as the medium that attracts and envelops the viewer and leads him to a dream world, a world of ideal perfection recreated by the atmosphere of total serenity and placidity that Claudio created with his light. Lorena's light was direct and natural, coming from the sun, which he placed in the middle of the scene, in sunrises or sunsets that gently illuminated all parts of the painting, sometimes placing in certain areas intense contrasts of light and shadow, or backlighting that impacted on a certain element to emphasize it. The artist from Lorraine emphasized color and light over the material description of the elements, which precedes to a great extent the luminous investigations of Impressionism.

Lorraine's capture of light is unparalleled by any of his contemporaries: in the landscapes of Rembrandt or Ruysdael the light has more dramatic effects, piercing the clouds or flowing in oblique or horizontal rays, but in a directed manner, the source of which can be easily located. On the other hand, Claudio's light is serene, diffuse; unlike the artists of his time, he gives it greater relevance if it is necessary to opt for a certain stylistic solution. On numerous occasions he uses the horizon line as a vanishing point, arranging in that place a focus of clarity that attracts the viewer, because that almost blinding luminosity acts as a focalizing element that brings the background closer to the foreground. The light is diffused from the background of the painting and, as it expands, it is enough by itself to create a sensation of depth, blurring the contours and degrading the colors to create the space of the painting. Lorena prefers the serene and placid light of the sun, direct or indirect, but always through a soft and uniform illumination, avoiding sensational effects such as moonlight, rainbows or storms, which were nevertheless used by other landscape painters of her time. His basic reference in the use of light is Elsheimer, but he differs from him in the choice of light sources and times represented: the German artist preferred exceptional light effects, nocturnal environments, moonlight or twilight; on the other hand, Claudio prefers more natural environments, a limpid light of dawn or the refulgence of a warm sunset.

On the other hand, the Flemish Peter Paul Rubens represents serenity in the face of Tenebrist dramatism. In his work, mythological themes stand out —although he was also the author of numerous religious works — in which he shows an aesthetic ideal of feminine beauty of robust figures and carnal sensuality, with a certain feeling of natural purity that gives his canvases a kind of dreamy candor, an optimistic and integrating vision of man's relationship with nature. He was a master in finding the precise tonality for the flesh tones of the skin, as well as its different textures and the multiple variants of the effects of brightness and the reflections of light on the flesh. Rubens had an in-depth knowledge of the different techniques and traditions related to light, and so he was able to assimilate both Mannerist iridescent light and Tenebrist focal light, internal and external light, homogeneous and dispersed light. In his work, light serves as an organizing element of the composition, in such a way that it agglutinates all the figures and objects in a unitary mass of the same light intensity, with different compositional systems, either with central or diagonal illumination or combining a light in the foreground with another in the background. In his beginnings he was influenced by the Caravaggist chiaroscuro, but from 1615 he sought a greater luminosity based on the tradition of Flemish painting, so he accentuated the light tones and marked the contours more. His images stand out for their sinuous movement, with atmospheres built with powerful lights that helped to organize the development of the action, combining the Flemish tradition with the Venetian coloring that he learned in his travels to Italy. Perhaps where he experimented most in the use of light was in his landscapes, most of them painted in his old age, whose use of color and light with agile and vibrant brushstrokes influenced Velázquez and other painters of his time, such as Jordaens and Van Dyck, and artists of later periods such as Jean-Antoine Watteau, Jean-Honoré Fragonard, Eugène Delacroix, and Pierre-Auguste Renoir.
Diego Velázquez was undoubtedly the most brilliant artist of his time in Spain, and one of the most internationally renowned. In the evolution of his style we can perceive a profound study of pictorial illumination, of the effects of light both on objects and on the environment, with which he reaches heights of great realism in the representation of his scenes, which however is not exempt from an air of classical idealization, which shows a clear intellectual background that for the artist was a vindication of the painter's craft as a creative and elevated activity. Velázquez was the architect of a space-light in which the atmosphere is a diaphanous matter full of light, which is freely distributed throughout a continuous space, without divisions of planes, in such a way that the light permeates the backgrounds, which acquire vitality and are as highlighted as the foreground. It is a world of instantaneous capture, alien to tangible reality, in which the light generates a dynamic effect that dilutes the contours, which together with the vibratory effect of the changing planes of light produces a sensation of movement. He usually alternated zones of light and shadow, creating a parallel stratification of space. Sometimes he even atomized the areas of light and shadow into small corpuscles, which was a precedent for impressionism.In his youth he was influenced by Caravaggio, to evolve later to a more diaphanous light, as shown in his two paintings of the Villa Medici, in which light filters through the trees. Throughout his career he achieved a great mastery in capturing a type of light of atmospheric origin, of the irradiation of light and chromatic vibration, with a fluid technique that pointed to the forms rather than defining them, thus achieving a dematerialized but truthful vision of reality, a reality that transcends matter and is framed in the world of ideas. After the smoothly executed tenebrism and precise drawing of his first period in Seville (Vieja friendo huevos, 1618, National Gallery of Scotland, Edinburgh; El aguador de Sevilla, 1620, Apsley House, London), his arrival at the Madrid court marked a stylistic change influenced by Rubens and the Venetian school — whose work he was able to study in the royal collections — with looser brushstrokes and soft volumes, while maintaining a realistic tone derived from his youthful period. Finally, after his trip to Italy between 1629 and 1631, he reached his definitive style, in which he synthesized the multiple influences received, with a fluid technique of pasty brushstrokes and great chromatic richness, as can be seen in La fragua de Vulcano (1631, Museo del Prado, Madrid). The Surrender of Breda (1635, Museo del Prado, Madrid) was a first milestone in his mastery of atmospheric light, where color and luminosity achieve an accentuated protagonism. In works such as Pablo de Valladolid (1633, Museo del Prado, Madrid), he managed to define the space without any geometric reference, only with lights and shadows. The Sevillian artist was a master at recreating the atmosphere of enclosed spaces, as shown in Las Meninas (1656, Museo del Prado, Madrid), where he placed several spotlights: the light that enters through the window and illuminates the figures of the Infanta and her ladies-in-waiting, the light from the rear window that shines around the lamp hanger and the light that enters through the door in the background. In this work he constructed a plausible space by defining or diluting the forms according to the use of light and the nuance of color, in a display of technical virtuosity that has led to the consideration of the canvas as one of the masterpieces in the history of painting. In a similar way, he succeeded in structuring space and forms by means of light planes in Las hilanderas (1657, Museo del Prado, Madrid).

Another outstanding Spanish Baroque painter was Bartolomé Esteban Murillo, one of whose favorite themes was the Immaculate Conception, of which he produced several versions, generally with the figure of the Virgin within an atmosphere of golden light symbolizing divinity. He generally used translucent colors applied in thin layers, with an almost watercolor appearance, a procedure that denotes the influence of Venetian painting. After a youthful period of tenebrist influence, in his mature work he rejected chiaroscuro dramatism and developed a serene luminosity that was shown in all its splendor in his characteristic breaks of glory, of rich chromaticism and soft luminosity.

The last period of this style was the so-called "full Baroque" (second half of the 17th and early 18th centuries), a decorative style in which the illusionist, theatrical and scenographic character of Baroque painting was intensified, with a predominance of mural painting — especially on ceilings — in which Pietro da Cortona, Andrea Pozzo, Giovanni Battista Gaulli (il Baciccio), Luca Giordano and Charles Le Brun stood out. In works such as the ceiling of the church of the Gesù, by Gaulli, or the Palazzo Barberini, in Cortona, is "where the ability to combine extreme light and darkness in a painting was pushed to the limit," according to John Gage, to which he adds that "the Baroque decorator not only introduced into painting the contrasts between extreme darkness and extreme light, but also a careful gradation between the two." Andrea Pozzo's Glory of Saint Ignatius of Loyola (1691-1694), on the ceiling of the church of Saint Ignatius in Rome, a scene full of heavenly light in which Christ sends a ray of light into the heart of the saint, who in turn deflects it into four beams of light directed towards the four continents, is noteworthy. In Spain, Francisco de Herrera el Mozo, Juan Carreño de Miranda, Claudio Coello and Francisco Ricci were exponents of this style.

18th Century 

The 18th century was nicknamed the "Age of Enlightenment", as it was the period in which the Enlightenment emerged, a philosophical movement that defended reason and science against religious dogmatism. Art oscillated between the late Baroque exuberance of Rococo and neoclassicist sobriety, between artifice and naturalism. A certain autonomy of the artistic act began to take place: art moved away from religion and the representation of power to be a faithful reflection of the artist's will, and focused more on the sensitive qualities of the work than on its meaning.

In this century most national art academies were created, institutions in charge of preserving art as a cultural phenomenon, of regulating its study and conservation, and of promoting it through exhibitions and competitions; originally, they also served as training centers for artists, although over time they lost this function, which was transferred to private institutions. After the Académie Royal d'Art, founded in Paris in 1648, this century saw the creation of the Royal Academy of Fine Arts of San Fernando in Madrid (1744), the Russian Academy of Arts in Saint Petersburg (1757), the Royal Academy of Arts in London (1768), etc. The art academies favored a classical and canonical style — academicism —  often criticized for its conservatism, especially by the avant-garde movements that emerged between the 19th and 20th centuries.

During this period, when the science was gaining greater interest for scholars and the general public, numerous studies of optics were carried out. In particular, the study of shadows was deepened and scynography emerged as the science that studies the perspective and two-dimensional representation of the forms produced by shadows. Claude-Nicolas Lecat wrote in 1767: "the art of drawing proves that the mere gradation of the shadow, its distributions and its nuances with simple light, suffice to form the images of all objects". In the entry on shadow in L'Encyclopédie, the great project of Diderot and d'Alembert, he differentiates between several types of shadows: "inherent", the object itself; "cast", that which is projected onto another surface; "projected", that resulting from the interposition of a solid between a surface and the light source; "tilted shading", when the angle is on the vertical axis; "tilted shading", when it is on the horizontal axis. It also coded light sources as "point", "ambient light" and "extensive", the former producing shadows with clipped edges, the ambient light producing no shadow and the extensive producing shadows with little clipping divided into two areas: "umbra", the darkened part of the area where the light source is located; and "penumbra", the darkened part of the edge of a single proportion of the light area.

Several treatises on painting were also written in this century that studied in depth the representation of light and shadow, such as those by Claude-Henri Watelet (L'Art de peindre, poème, avec des réflexions sur les différentes parties de la peinture, 1760) and Francesco Algarotti (Saggio sopra la pittura, 1764). Pierre-Henri de Valenciennes (Élémens de perspective pratique, a l'usage des artistes, suivis de réflexions et conseils à un élève sur la peinture, et particulièrement sur le genre du paysage, 1799) made several studies on the rendering of light at various times of the day, and recorded the various factors affecting the different types of light in the atmosphere, from the rotation of the Earth to the degree of humidity in the environment and the various reflective characteristics of a particular place. He advised his students to paint the same landscape at different times of the day and especially recommended four distinctive moments of the day: morning, characterized by freshness; noon, with its blinding sun; twilight and its fiery horizon; and night with the placid effects of moonlight. Acisclo Antonio Palomino, in El Museo Pictórico y Escala Óptica (1715-1724), stated that light is "the soul and life of everything visible" and that "it is in painting that gives such an extension to sight that it not only sees the physical and real but also the apparent and feigned, persuading bodies, distances and bulks with the elegant arrangement of light and dark, shadows and lights".

Rococo meant the survival of the main artistic manifestations of the Baroque, with a more emphasized sense of decoration and ornamental taste, which were taken to a paroxysm of richness, sophistication and elegance. Rococo painting had a special reference in France, in the court scenes of Jean-Antoine Watteau, François Boucher and Jean-Honoré Fragonard. Rococo painters preferred illuminated scenes in broad daylight or colorful sunrises and sunsets. Watteau was the painter of the fête galante, of court scenes set in bucolic landscapes, a type of shady landscape of Flemish heritage. Boucher, an admirer of Correggio, specialized in the female nude, with a soft and delicate style in which the light emphasizes the placidity of the scenes, generally mythological. Fragonard had a sentimental style of free technique, with which he elaborated gallant scenes of a certain frivolity. In the still life genre Jean-Baptiste-Siméon Chardin stood out, a virtuoso in the creation of atmospheres and light effects on objects and surfaces, generally with a soft and warm light achieved through glazes and fading, with which he achieved intimate atmospheres of deep shadows and soft gradients.

In this century, one of the movements most concerned with the effects of light was Venetian vedutismo, a genre of urban views that meticulously depicted the canals, monuments and places most typical of Venice, alone or with the presence of the human figure, generally of small size and in large groups of people. The veduta is usually composed of wide perspectives, with a distribution of the elements close to the scenography and with a careful use of light, which collects all the tradition of atmospheric representation from the sfumato of Leonardo and the chromatic ranges of sunrises and sunsets of Claudio de Lorena. Canaletto's work stands out, whose sublime landscapes of the Adriatic villa captured with great precision the atmosphere of the city suspended over the water. The great precision and detail of his works was due in large part to the use of the camera obscura, a forerunner of photography. Another outstanding representative was Francesco Guardi, interested in the sizzling effects of light on the water and the Venetian atmosphere, with a light touch technique that was a precursor of impressionism.

The landscape genre continued with the naturalistic experimentation begun in the Baroque in the Netherlands. Another reference was Claude Lorrain, whose influence was especially felt in England. The 18th century landscape incorporated the aesthetic concepts of the picturesque and the sublime, which gave the genre greater autonomy. One of the first exponents was the French painter Michel-Ange Houasse, who settled in Spain and initiated a new way of understanding the role of light in the landscape: in addition to illuminating it, light "constructs" the landscape, configures it and gives it consistency, and determines the vision of the work, since the variation of factors involved implies a specific and particular point of view. Claude Joseph Vernet specialized in seascapes, often painted in nocturnal environments by moonlight. He was influenced by Claude Lorrain and Salvator Rosa, from whom he inherited the concept of an idealized and sentimental landscape. The same type of landscape was developed by Hubert Robert, with a greater interest in picturesqueness, as evidenced by his interest in ruins, which serve as the setting for many of his works.

Landscape painting was also prominent in England, where the influence of Claude of Lorraine was felt to such an extent that it largely determined the planimetry of the English garden. Here there was a great love for gardens, so that landscape painting was quite sought after, unlike on the continent, where it was considered a minor genre. In this period many painters and watercolorists emerged who dedicated themselves to the transcription of the English landscape, where they captured a new sensibility towards the luminous and atmospheric effects of nature. In this type of work the main artistic value was the capture of the atmosphere and the clients valued above all a vision comparable to the contemplation of a real landscape. Prominent artists were: Richard Wilson, Alexander Cozens, John Robert Cozens, Robert Salmon, Samuel Scott, Francis Towne and Thomas Gainsborough.

One of the 18th century painters most concerned with light was Joseph Wright of Derby, who was interested in the effects of artificial light, which he masterfully captured. He spent some formative years in Italy, where he was interested in the effects of fireworks in the sky and painted the eruptions of Vesuvius. One of his masterpieces is Experiment with a Bird in an Air Pump (1768, The National Gallery, London), where he places a powerful light source in the center that illuminates all the characters, perhaps a metaphor for the Enlightenment light that illuminates all human beings equally. The light comes from a candle hidden behind the glass jar used to perform the experiment, whose shadow is placed next to a skull, both symbols of the transience of life, often used in vanitas. Wright made several paintings with artificial lighting, which he called candle light pictures, generally with violent contrasts of light and shadow. In addition — and especially in his paintings of scientific subjects, such as the one mentioned above or A Philosopher Gives a Lesson on the Table Planetarium (1766, Derby Museum and Art Gallery, Derby) — light symbolizes reason and knowledge, in keeping with the Enlightenment, the "Age of Enlightenment".

In the transition between the 18th and 19th centuries, one of the most outstanding artists was Francisco de Goya, who evolved from a more or less rococo style to a certain prerromanticism, but with a personal and expressive work with a strong intimate tone. Numerous scholars of his work have emphasized Goya's metaphorical use of light as the conqueror of darkness. For Goya, light represented reason, knowledge and freedom, as opposed to the ignorance, repression and superstition associated with darkness. He also said that in painting he saw "only illuminated bodies and bodies that are not, planes that advance and planes that recede, reliefs and depths". The artist himself painted a self-portrait of himself in his studio against the light of a large window that fills the room with light, but as if that were not enough, he is wearing lighted candles in his hat (Autorretrato en el taller, 1793-1795, Real Academia de Bellas Artes de San Fernando, Madrid). At the same time, he felt a special predilection for nocturnal atmospheres and in many of his works he took up a tradition that began with Caravaggist tenebrism and reinterpreted it in a personal way. According to Jeannine Baticle, "Goya is the faithful heir of the great Spanish pictorial tradition. In him, shadow and light create powerful volumes built in the impasto, clarified with brief luminous strokes in which the subtlety of the colors produces infinite variations".

Among his first production, in which he was mainly in charge of the elaboration of cartoons for the Royal Tapestry Factory of Santa Barbara, El quitasol (1777, Museo del Prado, Madrid) stands out for its luminosity, which follows the popular and traditional tastes in fashion at the court at that time, where a boy shades a young woman with a parasol, with an intense chromatic contrast between the bluish and golden tones of the light reflection. Other outstanding works for their atmospheric light effects are La nevada (1786, Museo del Prado, Madrid) and La pradera de San Isidro (1788, Museo del Prado, Madrid). As a painter of the king's chamber, his collective portrait La familia de Carlos IV (1800, Museo del Prado, Madrid) stands out, in which he seems to give a protocol order to the illumination, from the most powerful one centered on the kings in the central part, passing through the dimmer of the rest of the family to the penumbra in which the artist himself is portrayed in the left corner.

Of his mature work, Los fusilamientos del 3 de mayo de 1808 en la Moncloa (1814, Museo del Prado, Madrid) stands out, where he places the light source in a beacon located in the lower part of the painting, although it is his reflection in the white shirt of one of the executed men that becomes the most powerful focus of light, extolling his figure as a symbol of the innocent victim in the face of barbarism. The choice of night is a clearly symbolic factor, since it is related to death, a fact accentuated by the Christological appearance of the character with his arms raised. Albert Boime wrote about this work (Historia social del arte):

Among his last works is The Milkmaid of Bordeaux (1828, Museo del Prado, Madrid), where light is captured only with color, with a fluffy brushstroke that emphasizes the tonal values, a technique that points to impressionism.

Also between the two centuries, neoclassicism developed in France after the French Revolution, a style that favored the resurgence of classical forms, purer and more austere, as opposed to the ornamental excesses of the Baroque and Rococo. The discovery of the ruins of Pompeii and Herculaneum helped to make Greco-Latin culture and an aesthetic ideology that advocated the perfection of classical forms as an ideal of beauty fashionable, which generated a myth about the perfection of classical beauty that still conditions the perception of art today. Neoclassical painting maintained an austere and balanced style, influenced by Greco-Roman sculpture or figures such as Raphael and Poussin. Jacques-Louis David, as well as François Gérard, Antoine-Jean Gros, Pierre-Paul Prud'hon, Anne-Louis Girodet-Trioson, Jean Auguste Dominique Ingres, Anton Raphael Mengs and José de Madrazo stood out.

Neoclassicism replaced the dramatic illumination of the Baroque with the restraint and moderation of classicism, with cold tones and a preponderance of drawing over color, and gave special importance to line and contour. Neoclassical images put the idea before the feeling, the truthful description of reality before the imaginative whims of the Baroque artist. Neoclassicism is a clear, cold and diffuse light, which bathes the scenes with uniformity, without violent contrasts; even so, chiaroscuro was sometimes used, intensely illuminating figures or certain objects in contrast with the darkness of the background. The light delimits the contours and space, and generally gives an appearance of solemnity to the image, in keeping with the subjects treated, usually history, mythological and portrait paintings.

The initiator of this style was Jacques-Louis David, a sober artist who completely subordinated color to drawing. He meticulously studied the light composition of his works, as can be seen in The Oath at the Jeu de Paume (1791, Musée National du Château de Versailles) and The Rape of the Sabine Women (1794-1799, Musée du Louvre, Paris). In The Death of Marat (1793, Royal Museums of Fine Arts of Belgium, Brussels) he developed a play of light that shows the influence of Caravaggio. Anne-Louis Girodet-Trioson followed David's style, although his emotivism brought him closer to pre-Romanticism. He was interested in chromaticism and the concentration of light and shadow, as glimpsed in The Dream of Endymion (1791, Musée du Louvre, Paris) and The Burial of Atala (1808, Musée du Louvre, Paris). Jean Auguste Dominique Ingres was a prolific author always faithful to classicism, to the point of being considered the champion of academic painting against 19th century romanticism. He was especially devoted to portraits and nudes, which stand out for their purity of lines, their marked contours and a chromatism close to enamel. Pierre-Paul Prud'hon assumed neoclassicism with a certain rococo influence, with a predilection for feminine voluptuousness inherited from Boucher and Watteau, while his work shows a strong influence of Correggio. In his mythological paintings populated by nymphs, he showed a preference for twilight and lunar light, a dim and faint light that delicately bathes the female forms, whose white skin seems to glow.

Landscape painting was considered a minor genre by the neoclassicals. Even so, it had several outstanding exponents, especially in Germany, where Joseph Anton Koch, Ferdinand Kobell and Wilhelm von Kobell are worth mentioning. The former focused on the Alpine mountains, where he succeeded in capturing the cloudy atmosphere of the high mountains and the effects of sparkling light on the plant and water surfaces. He usually incorporated the human presence, sometimes with some thematic pretext of a historical or literary type — such as Shakespeare's plays or the Ossian cycle. The light in his paintings is generally clear and cold, natural, without too much stridency. If Koch represented a type of idealistic landscape, heir to Poussin or Lorraine, Ferdinand Kobell represents the realistic landscape, indebted to the Dutch Baroque landscape. His landscapes of valleys and plains with mountainous backgrounds are bathed in a translucent light, with intense contrasts between the various planes of the image. His son Wilhelm followed his style, with a greater concern for light, which is denoted in his clear environments of cold light and elongated shadows, which gives his figures a hard consistency and metallic appearance.

Contemporary Art

19th Century 
In the 19th century began an evolutionary dynamic of styles that followed one another chronologically with increasing speed and modern art emerged as opposed to academic art, where the artist is at the forefront of the cultural evolution of humanity. The study of light was enriched with the appearance of photography and with new technological advances in artificial light, thanks to the appearance of gaslight at the beginning of the century, kerosene in the middle of the century and electricity at the end of the century. These two phenomena brought about a new awareness of light, as this element configures the visual appearance, changing the concept of reality from the tangible to the perceptible.

Romanticism 

The first style of the century was Romanticism, a movement of profound renewal in all artistic genres, which paid special attention to the field of spirituality, fantasy, sentiment, love of nature, along with a darker element of irrationality, attraction to the occult, madness, dreams. Popular culture, the exotic, the return to underrated artistic forms of the past — especially medieval ones — were especially valued, and the landscape gained notoriety, which became a protagonist in its own right. The Romantics had the idea of an art that arose spontaneously from the individual, emphasizing the figure of the "genius": art is the expression of the artist's emotions. The Romantics used a more expressive technique with respect to neoclassical restraint, modeling the forms by means of impasto and glazes, in such a way that the expressiveness of the artist is released.

In a certain pre-Romanticism we can place William Blake, an original writer and artist, difficult to classify, who devoted himself especially to illustration, in the manner of the ancient illuminators of codices. Most of Blake's images are set in a nocturnal world, in which light emphasizes certain parts of the image, a light of dawn or twilight, almost "liquid", unreal. Between neoclassicism and romanticism was also Johann Heinrich Füssli, author of dreamlike images in a style influenced by Italian mannerism, in which he used to employ strong contrasts of light and shadow, with a type of lighting of theatrical character, like candlesticks.

One of the pioneers of Romanticism was the prematurely deceased Frenchman Théodore Géricault, whose masterpiece, The Raft of the Medusa (1819, Musée du Louvre, Paris), presents a ray of light emerging from the stormy clouds in the background as a symbol of hope. The most prominent member of the movement in France was Eugène Delacroix, a painter influenced by Rubens and the Venetian school, who conceived of painting as a medium in which patches of light and color are related. He was also influenced by John Constable, whose painting The Hay Wagon opened his eyes to a new sensitivity to light. In 1832 he traveled to Morocco, where he developed a new style that could be considered proto-impressionist, characterized by the use of white to highlight light effects, with a rapid execution technique.

In the field of landscape painting, John Constable and Joseph Mallord William Turner stood out, heirs of the rich tradition of English landscape painting of the 18th century. Constable was a pioneer in capturing atmospheric phenomena. Kenneth Clark, in The Art of Landscape, credited him with the invention of the "chiaroscuro of nature", which would be expressed in two ways: on the one hand, the contrast of light and shade that for Constable would be essential in any landscape painting and, on the other, the sparkling effects of dew and breeze that the British painter was able to capture so masterfully on his canvases, with a technique of interrupted strokes and touches of pure white made with a palette knife. Constable once said that "the form of an object is indifferent; light, shadow and perspective will always make it beautiful".

Joseph Mallord William Turner was a painter with a great intuition to capture the effects of light in nature, with environments that combine luminosity with atmospheric effects of great drama, as seen in Hannibal Crossing the Alps (1812, Tate Gallery, London). Turner had a predilection for violent atmospheric phenomena, such as storms, tidal waves, fog, rain, snow, or fire and spectacles of destruction, in landscapes in which he made numerous experiments on chromaticism and luminosity, which gave his works an aspect of great visual realism. His technique was based on a colored light that dissolved the forms in a space-color-light relationship that give his work an appearance of great modernity. According to Kenneth Clark, Turner "was the one who raised the key of color so that his paintings not only represented light, but also symbolized the nature of light". His early works still had a certain classical component, in which he imitated the style of artists such as Claude Lorrain, Richard Wilson, Adriaen van de Velde or Aelbert Cuyp. They are works in which he still represents light by means of contrast, executed in oil; however, his watercolors already pointed to what would be his mature style, characterized by the rendering of color and light in movement, with a clear tonality achieved with a primary application of a film of mother-of-pearl paint. In 1819 he visited Italy, whose light inspired him and induced him to elaborate images where the forms were diluted in a misty luminosity, with pearly moonscapes and shades of yellow or scarlet. He then devoted himself to his most characteristic images, mainly coastal scenes in which he made a profound study of atmospheric phenomena. In Interior at Petworth (1830, British Museum, London) the basis of his design is already light and color, the rest is subordinated to these values. In his later works Clark states that "Turner's imagination was capable of distilling, from light and color, poetry as delicate as Shelley's." Among his works are: San Giorgio Maggiore: At Dawn (1819, Tate Gallery), Regulus (1828, Tate Gallery), The Burning of the Houses of Lords and Commons (1835, Philadelphia Museum of Art), The Last Voyage of the "Daredevil" (1839, National Gallery), Negreros throwing the Dead and Dying Overboard (1840, Museum of Fine Arts, Boston), Twilight over a Lake (1840, Tate Gallery), Rain, Steam and Speed (1844, National Gallery), etc.

Mention should also be made of Richard Parkes Bonington, a prematurely deceased artist, primarily a watercolorist and lithographer, who lived most of his time in Paris. He had a light, clear and spontaneous style. His landscapes denote the same atmospheric sensibility of Constable and Turner, with a great delicacy in the treatment of light and color, to the point that he is considered a precursor of impressionism.

In Germany the figure of Caspar David Friedrich stands out, a painter with a pantheistic and poetic vision of nature, an uncorrupted and idealized nature where the human figure only represents the role of a spectator of the grandeur and infinity of nature. From his beginnings, Friedrich developed a style marked by sure contours and subtle play of light and shadow, in watercolor, oil or sepia ink. One of his first outstanding works is The Cross on the Mountain (1808, Gemäldegalerie Neue Meister, Dresden), where a cross with Christ crucified stands on a pyramid of rocks against the light, in front of a sky furrowed with clouds and crossed by five beams of light that emerge from an invisible sun that is intuited behind the mountain, without it being clear whether it is the sunrise or the sunset; One of the beams generates reflections on the crucifix, so it is understood that it is a metal sculpture. During his early years he focused on landscapes and seascapes, with warm sunrise and sunset lights, although he also experimented with the effects of winter, stormy and foggy lights. A more mature work is Memorial Image for Johann Emanuel Bremer (1817, Alte Nationalgalerie, Berlin), a night scene with a strong symbolic content alluding to death: in the foreground appears a garden in twilight, with a fence through which the rays of the moon filter; the background, with a faint light of dawn, represents the afterlife. In Woman at Sunrise (1818-1820, Folkwang Museum, Essen) — also called Woman at Sunset, since the time of day is not known with certainty — he showed one of his characteristic compositions, that of a human figure in front of the immensity of nature, a faithful reflection of the romantic feeling of the sublime, with a sky of a reddish yellow of great intensity; it is usually interpreted as an allegory of life as a permanent Holy Communion, a kind of religious communion devised by August Wilhelm von Schlegel. Between 1820 and 1822 he painted several landscapes in which he captured the variation of light at different times of the day: Morning, Noon, Afternoon and Sunset, all of them in the Niedersächsisches Landesmuseum in Hannover. For Friedrich, dawn and dusk symbolized birth and death, the cycle of life. In Sea with Sunrise (1826, Hamburger Kunsthalle, Hamburg) he reduced the composition to a minimum, playing with light and color to create an image of great intensity, inspired by the engravings of the 16th and 17th centuries that recreated the appearance of light on the first day of Creation. One of his last works was The Ages of Life (1835, Museum der bildenden Künste, Leipzig), where the five characters are related to the five boats at different distances from the horizon, symbolizing the ages of life. Other outstanding works of his are: Abbey in the Oak Grove (1809, Alte Nationalgalerie, Berlin), Rainbow in a Mountain Landscape (1809-1810, Folkwang Museum, Essen), View of a Harbor (1815-1816, Charlottenburg Palace, Berlin), The Wayfarer on the Sea of Clouds (1818, Hamburger Kunsthalle, Hamburg), Moonrise on the Seaside (1821, Hermitage Museum, Saint Petersburg), Sunset on the Baltic Sea (1831, Gemäldegalerie Neue Meister, Dresden), The Great Reservoir (1832, Gemäldegalerie Neue Meister, Dresden), etc. 

The Norwegian Johan Christian Dahl moved in the wake of Friedrich, although with a greater interest in light and atmospheric effects, which he captured in a naturalistic way, thus moving away from the romantic landscape. In his works he shows a special interest in the sky and clouds, as well as misty and moonlit landscapes. In many of his works the sky occupies almost the entire canvas, leaving only a narrow strip of land occupied by a solitary tree.

Georg Friedrich Kersting made a transposition of Friedrich's pantheistic mysticism to interior scenes, illuminated by a soft light of lamps or candles that gently illuminate the domestic environments that he used to represent, giving these scenes an appearance that transcends reality to become solemn images with a certain mysterious air.

Philipp Otto Runge developed his own theory of color, according to which he differentiated between opaque and transparent colors according to whether they tended to light or darkness. In his work this distinction served to highlight the figures in the foreground from the background of the scene, which was usually translucent, generating a psychological effect of transition between planes. This served to intensify the allegorical sense of his works, since his main objective was to show the mystical character of nature. Runge was a virtuoso in capturing the subtle effects of light, a mysterious light that has its roots in Altdorfer and Grünewald, as in his portraits illuminated from below with magical reflections that illuminate the character as if immersed in a halo.

The Nazarene movement also emerged in Germany, a series of painters who between 1810 and 1830 adopted a style that was supposedly old-fashioned, inspired by Renaissance classicism — mainly Fra Angelico, Perugino and Raphael — and with an accentuated religious sense. The Nazarene style was eclectic, with a preponderance of drawing over color and a diaphanous luminosity, with limitation or even rejection of chiaroscuro. Its main representatives were: Johann Friedrich Overbeck, Peter von Cornelius, Julius Schnorr von Carolsfeld and Franz Pforr.

Also in Germany and the Austro-Hungarian Empire there was the Biedermeier style, a more naturalistic tendency halfway between romanticism and realism. One of its main representatives was Ferdinand Georg Waldmüller, an advocate of the study of nature as the only goal of painting. His paintings are brimming with a resplendent clarity, a meticulously elaborated light of almost palpable quality, as an element that builds the reality of the painting, combined with well-defined shadows. Other artists of interest in this trend are Johann Erdmann Hummel, Carl Blechen, Carl Spitzweg and Moritz von Schwind. Hummel used light as a stylizing element, with a special interest in unusual light phenomena, from artificial light to glints and reflections. Blechen evolved from a typical romanticism with a heroic and fantastic tone to a naturalism that was characterized by light after a year's stay in Italy. Blechen's light is summery, a bright light that accentuates the volume of objects by giving them a tactile substance, combined with a skillful use of color. Spitzweg incorporated camera obscura effects into his paintings, in which light, whether sunlight or moonlight, appears in the form of beams that create effects that are sometimes unreal but of great visual impact. Schwind was the creator of a diaphanous and lyrical light, captured in resplendent luminous spaces with subtle tonal gradations in the reflections. Lastly, we should mention the Danish Christen Købke, author of landscapes of a delicate light reminiscent of the Pointillé of Vermeer or the luminosity of Gerrit Berckheyde.

In Spain, it is worth mentioning Jenaro Pérez Villaamil, who became the first professor of landscape painting at the San Fernando Academy.  Influenced by English landscape painting — especially David Roberts — his work is characterized by his neat drawing, his graceful line and his freshness of stroke, in paintings and watercolors in which he portrays the Spanish landscape from a picturesque and archaeological perspective, with a certain component of nostalgia.

In Italy in the 1830s the so-called Posillipo School, a group of anti-academic Neapolitan landscape painters, among whom Giacinto Gigante, Filippo Palizzi and Domenico Morelli stood out. These artists showed a new concern for light in the landscape, with a more truthful aspect, far from the classical canons, in which the shimmering effects gain prominence. Inspired by Vedutism and picturesque painting, as well as by the work of what they considered their direct master, Anton Sminck van Pitloo, they used to paint from life, in compositions in which the chromatism stands out without losing the solidity of the drawing.

Realism 

Romanticism was succeeded by realism, a trend that emphasized reality, the description of the surrounding world, especially of workers and peasants in the new framework of the industrial era, with a certain component of social denunciation, linked to political movements such as utopian socialism. These artists moved away from the usual historical, religious or mythological themes to deal with more mundane themes of modern life.

One of the realist painters most concerned with light was Jean-François Millet, influenced by Baroque and Romantic landscape painting, especially Caspar David Friedrich. He specialized in peasant scenes, often in landscapes set at dawn and dusk, as in On the Way to Work (1851, private collection), Shepherdess Watching Her Flock (1863, Musée d'Orsay, Paris) or A Norman Milkmaid at Gréville (1871, Los Angeles County Museum of Art). For the composition of his works he often used wax or clay figurines that he moved around to study the effects of light and volume. His technique was dense and vigorous brushwork, with strong contrasts of light and shadow. His masterpiece is The Angelus (1857, Musée d'Orsay, Paris): the evening setting of this work allows its author to emphasize the dramatic aspect of the scene, translated pictorially in non-contrasting tonalities, with the darkened figures standing out against the brightness of the sky, which increases its volumetry and accentuates its outline, resulting in an emotional vision that emphasizes the social message that the artist wants to convey. One of his last works was Bird Hunters (1874, Philadelphia Museum of Art), a nocturnal setting in which some peasants dazzle birds with a torch to hunt them, in which the luminosity of the torch stands out, achieved with a dense application of the pictorial impasto.

The champion of realism was Gustave Courbet, who in his training was nourished by Flemish, Dutch and Venetian painting of the 16th and 17th centuries, especially Rembrandt. His early works are still of romantic inspiration, in which he uses a dramatic light tone borrowed from the Flemish-Dutch tradition but reinterpreted with a more modern sensibility. His mature work, now fully realistic, shows the influence of the Le Nain brothers, and is characterized by large, meticulously worked works, with large shiny surfaces and a dense application of pigment, often done with a palette knife. At the end of his career he devoted himself more to landscape and nudes, which stand out for their luminous sensibility. Another reference was Honoré Daumier, painter, lithographer, and caricaturist with a strong satirical tone, loose and free stroke, with an effective use of chiaroscuro. In his paintings he was inspired by the light contrasts of Goya, giving his works little colorism and giving greater emphasis to light (The Fugitives, 1850; Barabbas, 1850; The Butcher, 1857; The Third Wagon, 1862).

Linked to realism was the French landscape school of Barbizon (Camille Corot, Théodore Rousseau, Charles-François Daubigny, Narcisse-Virgile Díaz de la Peña), marked by a pantheistic feeling of nature, with concern for the effects of light in the landscape, such as the light that filters through the branches of trees. The most outstanding was Camille Corot, who discovered light in Italy, where he dedicated himself to painting outdoors Roman landscapes captured at different times of the day, in scenes of clean atmospheres in which he applied to the surfaces of the volumes the precise doses of light to achieve a panoramic vision in which the volumes are cut out in the atmosphere. Corot had a predilection for a type of tremulous light that reflected on the water or filtered through the branches of the trees, with which he found a formula that satisfied him while achieving great popularity among the public.

Eugène Boudin, one of the first landscape painters to paint outdoors, especially seascapes, also stood out as an independent artist. He achieved great mastery in the elaboration of skies, shimmering and slightly misty skies of dim and transparent light, a light that is also reflected in the water with instantaneous effects that he knew how to capture with spontaneity and precision, with a fast technique that already pointed to impressionism — in fact, he was Monet's teacher.

Naturalistic landscape painting had another outstanding representative in Germany, Adolph von Menzel, who was influenced by Constable and developed a style in which light is decisive for the visual aspect of his works, with a technique that was a precursor of impressionism. Also noteworthy are his interior scenes with artificial light, in which he recreates a multitude of anecdotal details and luminous effects of all kinds, as in his Dinner after the Ball (1878, Alte Nationalgalerie, Berlin). Next to him stands out Hans Thoma, who was influenced by Courbet, who in his works combined the social vindication of realism with a still somewhat romantic feeling of the landscape. Thoma was an exponent of a "lyrical realism", with landscapes and paintings of peasant themes, usually set in his native Black Forest, characterized by the use of a silver-toned light.

In the Netherlands there was the figure of Johan Barthold Jongkind, considered a pre-impressionist, whom Monet also considered his master. He was a great interpreter of atmospheric phenomena and of the play of light on water and snow, as well as of winter and night lights — his moonlit landscapes were highly valued.

In Russia, a notable realist school also emerged, which developed both in landscape and genre scenes, generally endowed with a strong sense of social denunciation. Its main representatives were Vasili Perov, Iván Kramskói, Isaak Levitán, and especially, Iliá Repin.

In Spain, Carlos de Haes, Agustín Riancho and Joaquín Vayreda deserve to be mentioned. Haes, of Belgian origin, traveled the entire Spanish geography to capture its landscapes, which he captured with an almost topographical detail. Riancho had a predilection for mountain scenery, with a coloring with a certain tendency to dark shades, free and spontaneous. Vayreda was the founder of the so-called Olot School. Influenced by the Barbizon School, he applied this style to the Girona landscape, with works of diaphanous and serene composition with a certain lyrical component of bucolic evocation.

Also in Spain it is worth mentioning the work of Mariano Fortuny, who found his personal style in Morocco as a chronicler of the African War (1859-1860), where he discovered the colorfulness and exoticism that would characterize his work. Here he began to paint with quick sketches of luminous touches, with which he captured the action in a spontaneous and vigorous way, and which would be the basis of his style: a vibrantly executed colorism with flashing light effects, as is denoted in one of his masterpieces, La vicaría (1868-1870, Museo Nacional de Arte de Cataluña, Barcelona).

Another landscape school was the Italian school of the Macchiaioli (Silvestro Lega, Giovanni Fattori, Telemaco Signorini), of anti-academic style, characterized by the use of stains (macchia in Italian, hence the name of the group) of color and unfinished forms, sketched, a movement that preceded Impressionism. These artists painted from life and had as their main objective the reduction of painting to contrasts of light and brilliance. According to Diego Martelli, one of the theorists of the group, "we affirmed that form did not exist and that, just as in light everything results from color and chiaroscuro, so it is a matter of obtaining tones, the effects of the true". The Manchists revalued the light contrasts and knew how to transcribe in their canvases the power and clarity of the Mediterranean light. They captured like no one else the effects of the sun on objects and landscapes, as in the painting The Patrol by Giovanni Fattori, in which the artist uses a white wall as a luminous screen on which the figures are cut out.

In Great Britain, the school of the Pre-Raphaelites emerged, who were inspired — as their name indicates — by Italian painters before Raphael, as well as by the recently emerged photography, with exponents such as Dante Gabriel Rossetti, Edward Burne-Jones, John Everett Millais, William Holman Hunt and Ford Madox Brown. The Pre-Raphaelites sought a realistic vision of the world, based on images of great detail, vivid colors and brilliant workmanship; as opposed to the side lighting advocated by academicist painting, they preferred general lighting, which turned paintings into flat images, without great contrasts of light and shadow. To achieve maximum realism, they carried out numerous investigations, as in the painting The Rescuer (1855, National Gallery of Victoria, Melbourne), by John Everett Millais, in which a fireman saves two girls from a fire, for which the artist burned wood in his workshop to find the right lighting. The almost photographic detail of these works led John Ruskin to say of William Holman Hunt's The Wandering Sheep (1852, Tate Britain, London) that "for the first time in the history of art the absolutely faithful balance between color and shade is achieved, by which the actual brightness of the sun could be transported into a key by which possible harmonies with material pigments should produce on the mind the same impressions as are made by the light itself." Hunt was also the author of The Light of the World (1853, Keble College, Oxford University), in which light has a symbolic meaning, related to the biblical passage that identifies Christ with the phrase "I am the light of the world, he who follows me shall not walk in darkness, for he shall have the light of life" (John 8:12). This painter again portrayed the symbolic light of Jesus Christ in The Awakening of Consciousness (1853, Tate Britain), through the light of the garden streaming through the window.

Romanticism and realism were the first artistic movements that rejected the official art of the time, the art taught in the academies — academicism — an art that was institutionalized and anchored in the past both in the choice of subjects and in the techniques and resources made available to the artist. In France, in the second half of the 19th century, this art was called art pompier ("fireman's art", a pejorative name derived from the fact that many authors represented classical heroes with helmets that resembled fireman's helmets). Although in principle the academies were in tune with the art produced at the time, so we can not speak of a distinct style, in the 19th century, when the evolutionary dynamics of the styles began to move away from the classical canons, academic art was constrained in a classicist style based on strict rules. Academicism was stylistically based on Greco-Roman classicism, but also on earlier classicist authors, such as Raphael, Poussin or Guido Reni. Technically, it was based on careful drawing, formal balance, perfect line, plastic purity and careful detailing, together with realistic and harmonious coloring. Many of its representatives had a special predilection for the nude as an artistic theme, as well as a special attraction for orientalism. Its main representatives were: William-Adolphe Bouguereau, Alexandre Cabanel, Eùgene-Emmanuel Amaury-Duval and Jean-Léon Gérôme.

Impressionism 

Light played a fundamental role in impressionism, a style based on the representation of an image according to the "impression" that light produces to the eye. In contrast to academic art and its forms of representation based on linear perspective and geometry, the Impressionists sought to capture reality on the canvas as they perceived it visually, so they gave all the prominence to light and color. To this end, they used to paint outdoors (en plen air), capturing the various effects of light on the surrounding environment at different times of the day. They studied in depth the laws of optics and the physics of light and color. Their technique was based on loose brushstrokes and a combination of colors applied according to the viewer's vision, with a preponderance of contrast between elementary colors (yellow, red and blue) and their complements (orange, green and violet). In addition, they used to apply the pigment directly on the canvas, without mixing, thus achieving greater luminosity and brilliance.

Impressionism perfected the capture of light by means of fragmented touches of color, a procedure that had already been used to a greater or lesser extent by artists such as Giorgione, Titian, Guardi and Velázquez (it is well known that the Impressionists admired the genius of Las Meninas, whom they considered "the painter of painters"). For the Impressionists, light was the protagonist of the painting, so they began to paint from life, capturing at all times the variations of light on landscapes and objects, the fleeting "impression" of light at different times of the day, so they often produced series of paintings of the same place at different times. For this they dispensed with drawing and defined form and volume directly with color, in loose brushstrokes of pure tones, juxtaposed with each other. They also abandoned chiaroscuro and violent contrasts of light and shadow, for which they dispensed with colors such as black, gray or brown: the chromatic research of impressionism led to the discarding of black in painting, since they claimed that it is a color that does not exist in nature. From there they began to use a luminous range of "light on light" (white, blue, pink, red, violet), elaborating the shades with cold tones. Thus, the impressionists concluded that there is neither form nor color, the only real thing is the air-light relationship. In impressionist paintings the theme is light and its effects, beyond the anecdotal of places and characters. Impressionism was considerably influenced by research in the field of photography, which had shown that the vision of an object depends on the quantity and quality of light.

Impressionist painters were especially concerned with artificial light: according to Juan Antonio Ramirez (Mass Media and Art History, 1976), "the surprise at the effect of the new phenomenon of artificial light in the street, in cafés, and in the living room, gave rise to famous paintings such as Manet's Un bar aux Folies Bergère (1882, Courtauld Gallery, London), Renoir's Dancing at the Moulin de la Galette (1876, Musée d'Orsay, Paris) and Degas' Women in a Café (1877, Musée d'Orsay, Paris). Such paintings show the lighted lanterns and that glaucous tonality that only artificial light produces". Numerous Impressionist works are set in bars, cafés, dances, theaters and other establishments, with lamps or candelabras of dim light that mixes with the smoky air of the atmosphere of these places, or candle lights in the case of theaters and opera houses.

The main representatives were Claude Monet, Camille Pissarro, Alfred Sisley, Pierre-Auguste Renoir, and Edgar Degas, with an antecedent in Édouard Manet. The most strictly Impressionist painters were Monet, Sisley and Pissarro, the most concerned with capturing light in the landscape. Monet was a master in capturing atmospheric phenomena and the vibration of light on water and objects, with a technique of short brushstrokes of pure colors. He produced the greatest number of series of the same landscape at different times of the day, to capture all the nuances and subtle differences of each type of light, as in his series of The Station of Saint-Lazare, Haystacks, The Poplars, The Cathedral of Rouen, The Parliament of London, San Giorgio Maggiore or Water Lilies. His last works in Giverny on water lilies are close to abstraction, in which he achieves an unparalleled synthesis of light and color. In the mid-1880s he painted coastal scenes of the French Riviera with the highest degree of luminous intensity ever achieved in painting, in which the forms dissolve in pure incandescence and whose only subject is already the sensation of light.

Sisley also showed a great interest in the changing effects of light in the atmosphere, with a fragmented touch similar to that of Monet. His landscapes are of great lyricism, with a predilection for aquatic themes and a certain tendency to the dissolution of form. Pissarro, on the other hand, focused more on a rustic-looking landscape painting, with a vigorous and spontaneous brushstroke that conveyed "an intimate and profound feeling for nature", as the critic Théodore Duret said of him. In addition to his countryside landscapes, he produced urban views of Paris, Rouen and Dieppe, and also produced series of paintings at various times of the day and night, such as those of the Avenue de l'Opera and the Boulevard de Montmartre.

Renoir developed a more personal style, notable for its optimism and joie de vivre. He evolved from a realism of Courbetian influence to an impressionism of light and luminous colors, and shared for a time a style similar to that of Monet, with whom he spent several stays in Argenteuil. He differed from the latter especially in his greater presence of the human figure, an essential element for Renoir, as well as the use of tones such as black that were rejected by the other members of the group. He liked the play of light and shadow, which he achieved by means of small spots, and achieved great mastery in effects such as the beams of light between the branches of trees, as seen in his work Dance at the Moulin de la Galette (1876, Musée d'Orsay, Paris), and in Torso, sunlight effect where sunlight is seen on the skin of a naked girl (1875, Musée d'Orsay, Paris).

Degas was an individual figure, who although he shared most of the impressionist assumptions never considered himself part of the group. Contrary to the preferences of his peers, he did not paint from life and used drawing as a compositional basis. His work was influenced by photography and Japanese prints, and from his beginnings he showed interest in night and artificial light, as he himself expressed: "I work a lot on night effects, lamps, candles, etc. The curious thing is not always to show the light source, but the effect of the light". In his series of works on dancers or horse races, he studied the effects of light in movement, in a disarticulated space in which the effects of lights and backlighting stand out.

Many Impressionist works were almost exclusively about the effects of light on the landscape, which they tried to recreate as spontaneously as possible. However, this led in the 1880s to a certain reaction in which they tried to return to more classical canons of representation and a return to the figure as the basis of the composition. From then on, several styles derived from impressionism emerged, such as neo-impressionism (also called divisionism or pointillism) and post-impressionism. Neo-Impressionism took up the optical experimentation of Impressionism: the Impressionists used to blur the contours of objects by lowering the contrasts between light and shadow, which implied replacing objectual solidity with a disembodied luminosity, a process that culminated in Pointillism: in this technique there is no precise source of illumination, but each point is a light source in itself. The composition is based on juxtaposed ("divided") dots of a pure color, which merge in the eye of the viewer at a given distance. When these juxtaposed colors were complementary (red-green, yellow-violet, orange-blue) a greater luminosity was achieved. Pointillism, based largely on the theories of Michel-Eugène Chevreul (The Law of Simultaneous Contrast of Colors, 1839) and Ogden Rood (Modern Chromatics, 1879), defended the exclusive use of pure and complementary colors, applied in small brushstrokes in the form of dots that composed the image on the viewer's retina, at a certain distance. Its best exponents were Georges Seurat and Paul Signac.

Seurat devoted his entire life to the search for a method that would reconcile science and aesthetics, a personal method that would transcend impressionism. His main concern was chromatic contrast, its gradation and the interaction between colors and their complementaries. He created a disc with all the tones of the rainbow united by their intermediate colors and placed the pure tones in the center, which he gradually lightened towards the periphery, where the pure white was located, so that he could easily locate the complementary colors. This disc allowed him to mix the colors in his mind before fixing them on the palette, thus reducing the loss of chromatic intensity and luminosity. In his works he first drew in black and white to achieve the maximum balance between light and dark masses, and applied the color by tiny dots that were mixed in the retina of the viewer by optical mixing. On the other hand, he took from Charles Henry his theory on the relationship between aesthetics and physiology, how some forms or spatial directions could express pleasure and pain; according to this author, warm colors were dynamogenic and cold ones inhibitory. From 1886 he focused more on interior scenes with artificial light. His work Chahut (1889-1890, Kröller-Müller Museum, Otterlo) had a powerful influence on Cubism for its way of modeling volumes in space through light, without the need to simulate a third dimension.

Signac was a disciple of Seurat, although with a freer and more spontaneous style, not so scientific, in which the brilliance of color stands out. In his last years his works evolved to a search for pure sensation, with a chromatism of expressionist tendency, while he reduced the pointillist technique to a grid of tesserae of larger sizes than the divisionist dots.

In Italy there was a variant — the so-called divisionisti — who applied this technique to scenes of greater social commitment, due to its link with socialism, although with some changes in technical execution, since instead of confronting complementary colors they contrasted them in terms of rays of light, producing images that stand out for their luminosity and transparency, as in the work of Angelo Morbelli. Gaetano Previati developed a style in which luminosity is linked to symbolism related to life and nature, as in his Maternity (1890-1891, Banca Popolare di Novara), generally with a certain component of poetic evocation. Another member of the group, Vittore Grubicy de Dragon, wrote that "light is life and, if, as many rightly affirm, art is life, and light is a form of life, the divisionist technique, which tends to greatly increase the expressiveness of the canvas, can become the cradle of new aesthetic horizons for tomorrow".

Post-impressionism was, rather than a homogeneous movement, a grouping of diverse artists initially trained in impressionism who later followed individual trajectories of great stylistic diversity. Its best representatives were Henri de Toulouse-Lautrec, Paul Gauguin, Paul Cézanne, and Vincent van Gogh. Cézanne established a compositional system based on geometric figures (cube, cylinder and pyramid), which would later influence Cubism. He also devised a new method of illumination, in which light is applied in the density and intensity of color, rather than in the transitional values between black and white. The one who experimented the most in the field of light was Van Gogh, author of works of strong dramatism and interior prospection, with sinuous and dense brushstrokes, of intense color, in which he deforms reality, to which he gave a dreamlike air. Van Gogh's work shows influences as disparate as those of Millet and Hiroshige, while from the Impressionist school he was particularly influenced by Renoir. Already in his early works, his interest in light is noticeable, which is why he gradually clarified his palette, until he practically reached a yellow monochrome, with a fierce and temperamental luminosity.

In his early works, such as The Potato Eaters (1885, Van Gogh Museum, Amsterdam), the influence of Dutch realism, which had a tendency to chiaroscuro and dense color with thick brushstrokes, is evident; here he created a dramatic atmosphere of artificial light that emphasizes the tragedy of the miserable situation of these workers marginalized by the Industrial Revolution. Later his coloring became more intense, influenced by the divisionist technique, with a technique of superimposing brushstrokes in different tones; for the most illuminated areas he used yellow, orange and reddish tones, seeking a harmonious relationship between them all. After settling in Arles in Arles in 1888 he was fascinated by the limpid Mediterranean light and in his landscapes of that period he created clear and shining atmospheres, with hardly any chiaroscuro. As was usual in impressionism, he sometimes made several versions of the same motif at different times of the day to capture its light variations. He also continued his interest in artificial and nocturnal lights, as in Café de noche, interior (1888, Yale University Art Gallery, New Haven), where the light of the lamps seems to vibrate thanks to the concentric halo-shaped circles with which he has reflected the radiation of the light; or Café de noche, exterior (1888, Kröller-Müller Museum, Otterlo), where the luminosity of the café terrace contrasts with the darkness of the sky, where the stars seem like flowers of light. Light also plays a special role in his Sunflowers series (1888-1889), where he used all imaginable shades of yellow, which for him symbolized light and life, as he expressed in a letter to his brother Theo: "a sun, a light that, for lack of a better adjective, I can only define with yellow, a pale sulfur yellow, a pale lemon yellow". To highlight the yellow and orange, he used green and sky blue in the outlines, creating an effect of soft light intensity.

In Italy during these years there was a movement called Scapigliatura (1860-1880), sometimes considered a predecessor of divisionism, characterized by its interest in the purity of color and the study of light. Artists like Tranquillo Cremona, Mosè Bianchi or Daniele Ranzoni tried to capture on canvas their feelings through chromatic vibrations and blurred contours, with characters and objects almost dematerialized. Giovanni Segantini, a personal artist who combined a drawing of academicist tradition with a post-impressionist coloring where the light effects have a great relief. Segantini's specialty was the mountain landscape, which he painted outdoors, with a technique of strong brushstrokes and simple colors, with a vibrant light that he only found in the high alpine mountains.

In Germany, impressionism was represented by Fritz von Uhde, Lovis Corinth, and Max Slevogt. The first was more of a plenairist than strictly an impressionist, although more than landscape painting he devoted himself to genre painting, especially of religious themes, works in which he also showed a special sensitivity to light. Corinth had a rather eclectic career, from academic beginnings — he was a disciple of Bouguereau — through realism and impressionism, to a certain decadentism and an approach to Jugendstil, to finally end up in expressionism. Influenced by Rembrandt and Rubens, he painted portraits, landscapes and still lifes with a serene and brilliant chromatism. Slevogt assumed the fresh and brilliant chromatism of the Impressionists, although renouncing the fragmentation of colors that they made, and his technique was of loose brushstrokes and energetic movement, with bold and original light effects, which denote a certain influence of the baroque art of his native Bavaria.

In Great Britain, the work of James Abbott McNeil Whistler, American by birth but established in London since 1859, stood out. His landscapes are the antithesis of the sunny French landscapes, as they recreate the foggy and taciturn English climate, with a preference for night scenes, images from which he nevertheless knows how to distill an intense lyricism, with artificial light effects reflected in the waters of the Thames.

In the United States, it is worth mentioning the work of John Singer Sargent, Mary Cassatt, and Childe Hassam. Sargent was an admirer of Velázquez and Frans Hals, and excelled as a social portraitist, with a virtuoso and elegant technique, both in oil and watercolor, the latter mainly in landscapes of intense color. Cassatt lived for a long time in Paris, where he was related to the Impressionist circle, with whom he shared more the themes than the technique, and developed an intimate and sophisticated work, influenced by Japanese prints. Hassam's main motif was New York life, with a fresh but somewhat cloying style.

Mention should also be made of Scandinavian impressionism, many of whose artists were trained in Paris. These painters had a special sensitivity to light, perhaps due to its absence in their native land, so they traveled to France and Italy attracted by the "light of the south". The main exponents were Peder Severin Krøyer, Akseli Gallen-Kallela, and Anders Zorn. The former showed a special interest in highly complex lighting effects, such as the mixing of natural and artificial light. Gallen-Kallela was an original artist who later approached symbolism, with a personal expressive and stylized painting with a tendency towards romanticism, with a special interest in Finnish folklore. Zorn specialized in portraits, nudes and genre scenes, with a brilliant brushstroke of vibrant luminosity.

In Russia, Valentin Serov and Konstantin Korovin should be mentioned. Serov had a style similar to that of Manet or Renoir, with a taste for intense chromatism and light reflections, a bright light that extols the joy of life. Korovin painted both urban landscapes — Parisian street scenes — and natural landscapes — summer images in Crimea — in which he elevates a simple sketch of chromatic impression to the category of a work of art.

In Spain, the work of Aureliano de Beruete and Darío de Regoyos stands out. Beruete was a disciple of Carlos de Haes, so he was trained in the realist landscape, but assumed the impressionist technique after a period of training in France. An admirer of Velazquez's light, he knew how to apply it to the Castilian landscape — especially the mountains of Madrid — with his own personal style. Regoyos also trained with Haes and developed an intimate style halfway between pointillism and expressionism.

Luminism and symbolism 

From the mid-19th century until practically the transition to the 20th century, various styles emerged that placed special emphasis on the representation of light, which is why they were generically referred to as "luminism", with various national schools in the United States and various European countries or regions. The term luminism was introduced by John Ireland Howe Baur in 1954 to designate the landscape painting done in the United States between 1840 and 1880, which he defines as "a polished and meticulous realism in which there are no noticeable brushstrokes and no trace of impressionism, and in which atmospheric effects are achieved by infinitely careful gradations of tone, by the most exact study of the relative clarity of nearer and more distant objects, and by an accurate rendering of the variations of texture and color produced by direct or reflected rays".

The first was American Luminism, which gave rise to a group of landscape painters generally grouped in the so-called Hudson River School, in which we can include to a greater or lesser extent Thomas Cole, Asher Brown Durand, Frederic Edwin Church, Albert Bierstadt, Martin Johnson Heade, Fitz Henry Lane, John Frederick Kensett, James Augustus Suydam, Francis Augustus Silva, Jasper Francis Cropsey and George Caleb Bingham. In general, his works were based on bombastic compositions, with a horizon line of great depth and a sky of veiled aspect, with atmospheres of strong expressiveness. His light is serene and peaceful, reflecting a mood of love for nature, a nature largely in the United States of the time virgin and paradisiacal, yet to be explored. It is a transcendent light, of spiritual significance, whose radiance conveys a message of communion with nature. Although they use a classical structure and composition, the treatment of light is original because of the infinity of subtle variations in tonality, achieved through a meticulous study of the natural environment of their country. According to Barbara Novak, Luminism is a more serene form of the romantic aesthetic concept of the sublime, which had its translation in the deep expanses of the North American landscape.

Some historians differentiate between pure Luminism and Hudson River School landscape painting: in the former, the landscape — more centered in the New England area — is more peaceful, more anecdotal, with delicate tonal gradations characterized by a crystalline light that seems to emanate from the canvas, in neat brushstrokes that seem to recreate the surface of a mirror and in compositions in which the excess of detail is unreal due to its straightness and geometrism, resulting in an idealization of nature. Thus understood, Luminism would encompass Heade, Lane, Kensett, Suydam and Silva. Hudson River landscape painting, on the other hand, would have a more cosmic vision and a predilection for a wilder and more grandiloquent nature, with more dramatic visual effects, as seen in the work of Cole, Durand, Church, Bierstadt, Cropsey and Bingham. It must be said, however, that neither group ever accepted these labels.

Thomas Cole was the pioneer of the school. English by birth, one of his main references was Claude Lorrain. Settled in New York in 1825, he began to paint landscapes of the Hudson River area, with the aim of achieving "an elevated style of landscape" in which the moral message was equivalent to that of history painting. He also painted biblical subjects, in which light has a symbolic component, as in his Expulsion from the Garden of Eden (1828, Museum of Fine Arts, Boston). Durand was a little older than Cole and, after Cole's premature death, was considered the best American landscape painter of his time. An engraver by trade, from 1837 he turned to natural landscape painting, with a more intimate and picturesque vision of nature than Cole's allegorical one. Church was Cole's first disciple, who transmitted to him his vision of a majestic and exuberant nature, which he reflected in his scenes of the American West and the South American tropics. Bierstadt, of German origin, was influenced by Turner, whose atmospheric effects are seen in works such as In the Sierra Nevada Mountains in California (1868, Smithsonian American Art Museum, Washington D. C.), a lake between mountains seen after a storm, with the sun's rays breaking through the clouds. Heade was devoted to country landscapes of Massachusetts, Rhode Island and New Jersey, in meadows of endless horizons with clear or cloudy skies and lights of various times of day, sometimes refracted by humid atmospheres. Fitz Henry Lane is considered the greatest exponent of luminism. Handicapped since childhood by polio, he focused on the landscape of his native Gloucester (Massachusetts), with works that denote the influence of the English seascape painter Robert Salmon, in which light has a special role, a placid light that gives a sense of eternity, of time stopped in a serene perfection and harmony. Suydam focused on the coastal landscapes of New York and Rhode Island, in which he was able to reflect the light effects of the Atlantic coast. Kensett was influenced by Constable and devoted himself to the New England landscape with a special focus on the luminous reflections of the sky and the sea. Silva also excelled in the seascape, a genre in which he masterfully captured the subtle gradations of light in the coastal atmosphere. Cropsey combined the panoramic effect of the Hudson River School with the more serene luminism of Lane and Heade, with a meticulous and somewhat theatrical style. Bingham masterfully captured in his scenes of the Far West the limpid and clear light of dawn, his favorite when recreating scenes with American Indians and pioneers of the conquest of the West.

Winslow Homer, considered the best American painter of the second half of the 19th century, who excelled in both oil and watercolor and in both landscape and popular scenes of American society, deserves special mention. One of his favorite genres was the seascape, in which he displayed a great interest in atmospheric effects and the changing lights of the day. His painting Moonlight. Wood Island Lighthouse (1894, Museum of Modern Art, New York) was painted entirely by moonlight, in five hours of work.

Another important school was Belgian Luminism. In Belgium, the influence of French Impressionism was strongly felt, initially in the work of the group called Les Vingt, as well as in the School of Tervueren, a group of landscape painters who already showed their interest in light, especially in the atmospheric effects, as can be seen in the work of Isidore Verheyden. Later, Pointillism was the main influence on Belgian artists of the time, a trend embraced by Émile Claus and Théo van Rysselberghe, the main representatives of Belgian Luminism. Claus adopted Impressionist techniques, although he maintained academic drawing as the basis for his compositions, and in his work — mainly landscapes — he showed great interest in the study of the effects of light in different atmospheric conditions, with a style that sometimes recalls Monet. Rysselberghe was influenced by Manet, Degas, and Whistler, as well as by the Baroque painter Frans Hals and Spanish painting. His technique was of loose and vigorous brushwork, with great luminous contrasts.

A luminist school also emerged in the Netherlands, more closely linked to the incipient Fauvism, in which Jan Toorop, Leo Gestel, Jan Sluyters, and the early work of Piet Mondrian stood out. Toorop was an eclectic artist, who combined different styles in the search for his own language, such as symbolism, modernism, pointillism, Gauguinian synthetism, Beardsley's linearism, and Japanese printmaking. He was especially devoted to allegorical and symbolic themes and, since 1905, to religious themes.

In Germany, Max Liebermann received an initial realist influence — mainly from Millet — and a slight impressionist inclination towards 1890, until he ended up in a luminism of personal inspiration, with violent brushstrokes and brilliant light, a light of his own research with which he experimented until his death in 1935.

In Spain, luminism developed especially in Valencia and Catalonia. The main representative of the Valencian school was Joaquín Sorolla, although the work of Ignacio Pinazo, Teodoro Andreu, Vicente Castell and Francisco Benítez Mellado is also noteworthy. Sorolla was a master at capturing the light in nature, as is evident in his seascapes, painted with a gradual palette of colors and a variable brushstroke, wider for specific shapes and smaller to capture the different effects of light. An interpreter of the Mediterranean sun like no other, a French critic said of him that "never has a paintbrush contained so much sun". After a period of training, in the 1890s he began to consolidate his style, based on a genre theme with a technique of rapid execution, preferably outdoors, with a thick brushstroke, energetic and impulsive, and with a constant concern for the capture of light, on which he did not cease to investigate its more subtle effects. La vuelta de la pesca (1895) is the first work that shows a particular interest in the study of light, especially in its reverberation in the water and in the sails moved by the wind. It was followed by Pescadores valencianos (1895), Cosiendo la vela (1896) and Comiendo en la barca (1898). In 1900 he visited with Aureliano de Beruete the Universal Exhibition in Paris, where he was fascinated by the intense chromatism of the Nordic artists, such as Anders Zorn, Max Liebermann or Peder Severin Krøyer; From here he intensified his coloring and, especially, his luminosity, with a light that invaded the whole painting, emphasizing the blinding whites, as in Jávea (1900), Idilio (1900), Playa de Valencia (1902), in two versions, morning and sunset, Evening Sun (1903), The Three Sails (1903), Children at the Seashore (1903), Fisherman (1904), Summer (1904), The White Boat (1905), Bathing in Jávea (1905), etc. They are preferably seascape, with a warm Mediterranean light of which he feels special predilection for that of the month of September, more golden. From 1906 he lowered the intensity of his palette, with a more nuanced tonality and a predilection for mauve ink; he continued with the seascapes, but increased the production of other types of landscapes, as well as gardens and portraits. He summered in Biarritz and the pale and soft light of the Atlantic Ocean made him lower the luminosity of his works. He also continues with his Valencian scenes: Paseo a orillas del mar (1909), Después del baño (1909). Between 1909 and 1910 his stays in Andalusia induced him to blur the contours, with a technique close to pointillism, with a predominance of white, pink, and mauve. Among his last works is La bata rosa (1916), in which he unleashes an abundance of light that filters through all parts of the canvas, highlighting the use of light and color on the treatment of the contours, which appear blurred.

The Luminist School of Sitges emerged in Catalonia, active in this town in the Garraf between 1878 and 1892. Its most prominent members were Arcadi Mas i Fondevila, Joaquim de Miró, Joan Batlle i Amell, Antoni Almirall and Joan Roig i Soler. Opposed in a certain way to the Olot School, whose painters treated the landscape of the interior of Catalonia with a softer and more filtered light, the Sitgetan artists opted for the warm and vibrant Mediterranean light and the atmospheric effects of the Garraf coast. Heirs to a large extent of Fortuny, the members of this school sought to faithfully reflect the luminous effects of the surrounding landscape, in harmonious compositions that combined verism and a certain poetic and idealized vision of nature, with a subtle chromaticism and a fluid brushstroke that was sometimes described as impressionist.

The Sitges School is generally considered a precursor of Catalan modernism: two of its main representatives, Ramon Casas and Santiago Rusiñol, spent several seasons in the town of Sitges, where they adopted the custom of painting d'après nature and assumed as the protagonist of their works the luminosity of the environment that surrounded them, although with other formal and compositional solutions in which the influence of French painting is evident. Casas studied in Paris, where he was trained in impressionism, with special influence of Degas and Whistler. His technique stands out for the synthetic brushstroke and the somewhat blurred line, with a theme focused preferably on interiors and outdoor images, as well as popular scenes and social vindication. Rusiñol showed a special sensitivity for the capture of light especially in his landscapes and his series of Gardens of Spain — he especially loved the gardens of Mallorca (the sones) and Granada — in which he developed a great ability for the effects of light filtered between the branches of the trees, creating unique environments where light and shadow play capriciously. Likewise, Rusiñol's light shows the longing for the past, for the time that flees, for the instant frozen in time whose memory will live on in the artist's work.

From the 1880s until the turn of the century, symbolism was a fantastic and dreamlike style that emerged as a reaction to the naturalism of the realist and impressionist currents, placing special emphasis on the world of dreams, as well as on satanic and terrifying aspects, sex and perversion. A main characteristic of symbolism was aestheticism, a reaction to the prevailing utilitarianism of the time and to the ugliness and materialism of the industrial era. Symbolism gave art and beauty an autonomy of their own, synthesized in Théophile Gautier's formula "art for art's sake" (L'art pour l'art). This current was also linked to modernism (also known as Art Nouveau in France, Modern Style in the United Kingdom, Jugendstil in Germany, Sezession in Austria or Liberty in Italy). Symbolism was an anti-scientific and anti-naturalist movement, so light lost objectivity and was used as a symbolic element, in conjunction with the rest of the visual and iconographic resources of this style. It is a transcendent light, which behind the material world suggests a spirituality, whether religious or pantheistic, or perhaps simply a state of mind of the artist, a feeling, an emotion. Light, by its dematerialization, exerted a powerful influence on these artists, a light far removed from the physical world in its conception, although for its execution they often made use of impressionist and pointillist techniques.

The movement originated in France with figures such as Gustave Moreau, Odilon Redon and Pierre Puvis de Chavannes. Moreau was still trained in romanticism under the influence of his teacher, Théodore Chassériau, but evolved a personal style in both subject matter and technique, with mystical images with a strong component of sensuality, a resplendent chromaticism with an enamel-like finish and the use of a chiaroscuro of golden shadows. Redon developed a fantastic and dreamlike theme, influenced by the literature of Edgar Allan Poe, which largely preceded surrealism. Until the age of fifty he worked almost exclusively in charcoal drawing and lithography, although he later became an excellent colorist, both in oil and pastel. Puvis de Chavannes was an outstanding muralist, a procedure that suited him well to develop his preference for cold tones, which gave the appearance of fresco painting. His style was more serene and harmonious, with an allegorical theme evoking an idealized past, simple forms, rhythmic lines and a subjective coloring, far from naturalism. In France there was also the movement of the Nabis ("prophets" in Hebrew), formed by Paul Sérusier, Édouard Vuillard, Pierre Bonnard, Maurice Denis and Félix Vallotton. This group was influenced by Gauguin's rhythmic scheme and stood out for an intense chromatism of strong expressiveness.

Another focus of symbolism was Belgium, where the work of Félicien Rops, Fernand Khnopff and William Degouve de Nuncques should be noted. The first was a painter and graphic artist of great imagination, with a predilection for a theme centered on perversity and eroticism. Khnopff developed a dreamlike-allegorical theme of women transformed into angels or sphinxes, with disturbing atmospheres of great technical refinement. Degouve de Nuncques elaborated urban landscapes with a preference for nocturnal settings, with a dreamlike component precursor of surrealism: his work The Blind House (1892, Kröller-Müller Museum, Otterlo) influenced René Magritte's The Empire of Lights (1954, Royal Museums of Fine Arts of Belgium, Brussels).

In Central Europe, the Swiss Arnold Böcklin and Ferdinand Hodler and the Austrian Gustav Klimt stood out. Böcklin specialized in a theme of fantastic beings, such as nymphs, satyrs, tritons or naiads, with a somber and somewhat morbid style, such as his painting The Island of the Dead (1880, Metropolitan Museum of Art, New York), where a pale, cold and whitish light envelops the atmosphere of the island where Charon's boat is headed. Hodler evolved from a certain naturalism to a personal style he called "parallelism", characterized by rhythmic schemes in which line, form and color are reproduced in a repetitive way, with simplified and monumental figures. It was in his landscapes that he showed the greatest luminosity, with pure and vibrant coloring. Klimt had an academic training, to lead to a personal style that synthesized impressionism, modernism and symbolism. He had a preference for mural painting, with an allegorical theme with a tendency towards eroticism, and with a decorative style populated with arabesques, butterfly wings or peacocks, and with a taste for the golden color that gave his works an intense luminosity.

In Italy, it is worth mentioning Giuseppe Pellizza da Volpedo, formed in the divisionist environment, but who evolved to a personal style marked by an intense and vibrant light, whose starting point is his work Lost Hopes (1894, Ponti-Grün collection, Rome). In The Rising Sun or the Sun (1903-1904, National Gallery of Modern Art, Rome) he carried out a prodigious exercise in the exaltation of light, a refulgent dawn light that peeks over a mountainous horizon and seems to burst into a myriad of rays that spread in all directions, dazzling the viewer. A symbolic reading can be established for this work, given the social and political commitment of the artist, since the rising sun was taken by socialism as a metaphor for the new society to which this ideology aspired.

In the Scandinavian sphere, it is worth remembering the Norwegian Christian Krohg and the Danish Vilhelm Hammershøi and Jens Ferdinand Willumsen. The former combined natural and artificial lights, often with theatrical effects and certain unreal connotations, as in The Sleeping Seamstress (1885, Nasjonalgalleriet, Oslo), where the double presence of a lamp next to a window through which daylight enters provokes a sensation of timelessness, of temporal indefinition. Hammershøi was a virtuoso in the handling of light, which he considered the main protagonist of his works. Most of his paintings were set in interior spaces with lights filtered through doors or windows, with figures generally with their backs turned. Willumsen developed a personal style based on the influence of Gauguin, with a taste for bright colors, as in After the Storm (1905, Nasjonalgalleriet, Oslo), a navy with a dazzling sun that seems to explode in the sky.

Finally, it is worth mentioning a phenomenon between the 19th and 20th centuries that was a precedent for avant-garde art, especially in terms of its anti-academic component: naïf art ("naïve" in French), a term applied to a series of self-taught painters who developed a spontaneous style, alien to the technical and aesthetic principles of traditional painting, sometimes labeled as childish or primitive. One of its best representatives was Henri Rousseau, a customs officer by trade, who produced a personal work, with a poetic tone and a taste for the exotic, in which he lost interest in perspective and resorted to unreal-looking lighting, without shadows or perceptible light sources, a type of image that influenced artists such as Picasso or Kandinski and movements such as metaphysical painting and surrealism.

20th Century 

The art of the 20th century underwent a profound transformation: in a more materialistic, more consumerist society, art was directed to the senses, not to the intellect. The avant-garde movements arose, which sought to integrate art into society through a greater interrelation between artist and spectator, since it was the latter who interpreted the work, and could discover meanings that the artist did not even know. Avant-gardism rejected the traditional methods of optical representation — Renaissance perspective — to vindicate the two-dimensionality of painting and the autonomous character of the image, which implied the abandonment of space and light contrasts. In their place, light and shadow would no longer be instruments of a technique of spatial representation, but integral parts of the image, of the conception of the work as a homogeneous whole. On the other hand, other artistic methods such as photography, film and video had a notable influence on the art of this century, as well as, in relation to light, the installation, one of the variants of which is light art. On the other hand, the new interrelationship with the spectator means that the artist does not reflect what he sees, but lets the spectator see his vision of reality, which will be interpreted individually by each person.

Advances in artificial light (carbon and tungsten filaments, neon lights) led society in general to a new sensitivity to luminous impacts and, for artists in particular, to a new reflection on the technical and aesthetic properties of the new technological advances. Many artists of the new century experimented with all kinds of lights and their interrelation, such as the mixture and interweaving of natural and artificial lights, the control of the focal point, the dense atmospheres, the shaded or transparent colors and other types of sensorial experiences, already initiated by the impressionists but which in the new century acquired a category of their own.

Avant-garde 

The emergence of the avant-garde at the turn of the century brought a rapid succession of artistic movements, each with a particular technique and a particular vision of the function of light and color in painting: fauvism and expressionism were heirs of post-impressionism and treated light to the maximum of its saturation, with strong chromatic contrasts and the use of complementary colors for shadows; cubism, futurism and surrealism had in common a subjective use of color, giving primacy to the expression of the artist over the objectivity of the image.

One of the first movements of the 20th century concerned with light and, especially, color, was Fauvism (1904-1908). This style involved experimentation in the field of color, which was conceived in a subjective and personal way, applying emotional and expressive values to it, independent of nature. For these artists, colors had to generate emotions, through a subjective chromatic range and brilliant workmanship. In this movement a new conception of pictorial illumination arose, which consisted in the negation of shadows; the light comes from the colors themselves, which acquire an intense and radiant luminosity, whose contrast is achieved through the variety of pigments used.

Fauvist painters include Henri Matisse, Albert Marquet, Raoul Dufy, André Derain, Maurice de Vlaminck and Kees van Dongen. Perhaps the most gifted was Matisse, who "discovered" light in Collioure, where he understood that intense light eliminates shadows and highlights the purity of colors; from then on he used pure colors, to which he gave an intense luminosity. According to Matisse, "color contributes to expressing light, not its physical phenomenon but the only light that exists in fact, that of the artist's brain". One of his best works is Luxury, Calm and Voluptuousness (1904, Musée d'Orsay, Paris), a scene of bathers on the beach illuminated by intense sunlight, in a pointillist technique of juxtaposed patches of pure and complementary colors.

Related to this style was Pierre Bonnard, who had been a member of the Nabis, an intimist painter with a predilection for the female nude, as in his Nude against the light (1908, Royal Museums of Fine Arts of Belgium, Brussels), in which the woman's body is elaborated with light, enclosed in a space formed by the vibrant light of a window sifted by a blind.

Expressionism (1905-1923) emerged as a reaction to impressionism, against which they defended a more personal and intuitive art, where the artist's inner vision — the "expression" — prevailed over the representation of reality — the "impression" —. In their works they reflected a personal and intimate theme with a taste for the fantastic, deforming reality to accentuate the expressive character of the work. Expressionism was an eclectic movement, with multiple tendencies in its midst and a diverse variety of influences, from post-impressionism and symbolism to fauvism and cubism, as well as some aniconic tendencies that would lead to abstract art (Kandinski). Expressionist light is more conceptual than sensorial, it is a light that emerges from within and expresses the artist's mentality, his consciousness, his way of seeing the world, his subjective "expression".

With precedents in the figures of Edvard Munch and James Ensor, it was formed mainly around two groups: Die Brücke (Ernst Ludwig Kirchner, Erich Heckel, Karl Schmidt-Rottluff, Emil Nolde) and Der Blaue Reiter (Vasili Kandinski, Franz Marc, August Macke, Paul Klee). Other exponents were the Vienna Group (Egon Schiele, Oskar Kokoschka) and the School of Paris (Amedeo Modigliani, Marc Chagall, Georges Rouault, Chaïm Soutine). Edvard Munch was linked in his beginnings to symbolism, but his early work already reflects a certain existential anguish that will lead him to a personal painting of strong psychological introspection, in which light is a reflection of the emptiness of existence, of the lack of communication and of the subordination of physical reality to the artist's inner vision, as can be seen in the faces of his characters, with a spectral lighting that gives them the appearance of automatons. The members of Die Brücke ("The Bridge") — especially Kirchner, Heckel and Schmidt-Rottluff — developed a dark, introspective and anguished subject matter, where form, color and light are subjective, resulting in tense, unsettling works that emphasize the loneliness and rootlessness of the human being. The light in these artists is not illuminating, it does not respond to physical criteria, as can be seen in Erich Heckel and Otto Müller playing Kirchner's chess (1913, Brücke Museum Berlin), where the lamp on the table does not radiate light and constitutes a strange object, alien to the scene. Der Blaue Reiter ("The Blue Rider") emerged in Munich in 1911 and more than a common stylistic stamp shared a certain vision of art, in which the creative freedom of the artist and the personal and subjective expression of his works prevailed. It was a more spiritual and abstract movement, with a technical predilection for watercolor, which gave his works an intense chromatism and luminosity.

Cubism (1907-1914) was based on the deformation of reality by destroying the spatial perspective of Renaissance origin, organizing space according to a geometric grid, with simultaneous vision of objects, a range of cold and muted colors, and a new conception of the work of art, with the introduction of collage. It was the first movement that dissociated light from reality, by eliminating the tangible focus that in all the previous history of painting illuminated the pictures, whether natural or artificial; in its place, each part of the picture, each space that has been deconstructed into geometric planes, has its own luminosity. Jean Metzinger, in On Cubism (1912), wrote that "beams of light and shadows distributed in such a way that one engenders the other plastically justify the ruptures whose orientation creates the rhythm".

The main figure of this movement was Pablo Picasso, one of the great geniuses of the 20th century, along with Georges Braque, Jean Metzinger, Albert Gleizes, Juan Gris, and Fernand Léger. Before ending up in cubism, Picasso went through the so-called blue and rose periods: in the first one, the influence of El Greco can be seen in his elongated figures of dramatic appearance, with profiles highlighted by a yellowish or greenish light and shadows of thick black brushstrokes; in the second one, he deals with kinder and more human themes, being characteristic the scenes of figures immersed in empty landscapes of luminous appearance. His cubist stage is divided into two phases: in "analytical cubism" he focused on portraits and still lifes, with images broken down into planes in which light loses its modeling and volume-defining character to become a constructive element that emphasizes contrast, giving the image an iridescent appearance; in "synthetic cubism" he expanded the chromatic range and included extra-pictorial elements, such as texts and fragments of literary works. After his cubist stage, his most famous work is Guernica, entirely elaborated in shades of gray, a night scene illuminated by the lights of a light bulb in the ceiling — shaped like a sun and an eye at the same time — and of a quinque in the hands of the character leaning out of the window, with a light constructed by planes that serve as counterpoints of light in the midst of darkness.

A movement derived from Cubism was Orphism, represented especially by Robert Delaunay, who experimented with light and color in his abstracting search for rhythm and movement, as in his series on the Eiffel Tower or in Field of Mars. The Red Tower, where he decomposes light into the colors of the prism to diffuse it through the space of the painting. Delaunay studied optics and came to the conclusion that "the fragmentation of form by light creates planes of colors", so in his work he explored with intensity the rhythms of colors, a style he called "simultaneism" taking the scientific concept of simultaneous contrasts created by Chevreul. For Delaunay, "painting is, properly speaking, a luminous language", which led him in his artistic evolution towards abstraction, as in his series of Windows, Disks and Circular and Cosmic Forms, in which he represents beams of light elaborated with bright colors in an ideal space.

Another style concerned with optical experimentation was Futurism (1909-1930), an Italian movement that exalted the values of the technical and industrial progress of the 20th century and emphasized aspects of reality such as movement, speed and simultaneity of action. Prominent among its ranks were Giacomo Balla, Gino Severini, Carlo Carrà and Umberto Boccioni. These artists were the first to treat light in an almost abstract way, as in Boccioni's paintings, which were based on pointillist technique and the optical theories of color to carry out a study of the abstract effects of light, as in his work The City Rises (1910-1911, Museum of Modern Art, New York). Boccioni declared in 1910 that "movement and light destroy the matter of objects" and aimed to "represent not the optical or analytical impression, but the psychic and total experience". Gino Severini evolved from a still pointillist technique towards Cubist spatial fragmentation applied to Futurist themes, as in his Expansión de la luz (1912, Museo Thyssen-Bornemisza, Madrid), where the fragmentation of color planes contributes to the construction of plastic rhythms, which enhances the sensation of movement and speed. Carlo Carrà elaborated works of pointillist technique in which he experimented with light and movement, as in La salida del teatro (1909, private collection), where he shows a series of pedestrians barely sketched in their elemental forms and elaborated with lines of light and color, while in the street artificial lights gleam, whose flashes seem to cut the air.

Balla synthesized neo-Impressionist chromaticism, pointillist technique and cubist structural analysis in his works, decomposing light to achieve his desired effects of movement. In La jornada del operario (1904, private collection), he divided the work into three scenes separated by frames, two on the left and one on the right of double size. They represent dawn, noon and twilight, in which he depicts various phases of the construction of a building, consigning a day's work; the two parts on the left are actually a single image separated by the frame, but with a different treatment of light for the time of day. In Arc Lamp (1911-1912, Museum of Modern Art, New York) he made an analytical study of the patterns and colors of a beam of light, an artificial light in conflict with moonlight, in a symbolism in which the electric light represents the energy of youth as opposed to the lunar light of classicism and romanticism. In this work the light seems to be observed under a microscope, from the incandescent center of the lamp sprouts a series of colored arrows that gradually lose chromatism as they move away from the bright focus until they merge with the darkness. Balla himself stated that "the splendor of light is obtained by bringing pure colors closer together. This painting is not only original as a work of art, but also scientific, since I sought to represent light by separating the colors that compose it".

Outside Italy, Futurism influenced various parallel movements such as English Vorticism, whose best exponent was Christopher Richard Wynne Nevinson, a painter who showed a sensitivity for luminous effects reminiscent of Severini, as seen in his Starry Shell (1916, Tate Gallery, London); or Russian Rayonism, represented by Mikhail Larionov and Natalia Goncharova, a style that combined the interest in light beams typical of analytical cubism with the radiant dynamism of futurism, although it later evolved towards abstraction.

In Italy also emerged the so-called metaphysical painting, considered a forerunner of surrealism, represented mainly by Giorgio de Chirico and Carlo Carrà. Initially influenced by symbolism, De Chirico was the creator of a style opposed to futurism, more serene and static, with certain reminiscences of classical Greco-Roman art and Renaissance linear perspective. In his works he created a world of intellectual placidity, a dreamlike space where reality is transformed for the sake of a transcendent evocation, with spaces of wide perspectives populated by figures and isolated objects in which a diaphanous and uniform illumination creates elongated shadows of unreal aspect, creating an overwhelming sensation of loneliness. In his urban spaces, empty and geometrized, populated by faceless mannequins, the lights and shadows create strong contrasts that help to enhance the dreamlike factor of the image. Another artist of this movement is Giorgio Morandi, author of still lifes in which chiaroscuro has a clear protagonism, in compositions where light and shadow play a primordial role to build an unreal and dreamlike atmosphere.

With abstract art (1910-1932) the artist no longer tries to reflect reality, but his inner world, to express his feelings. The art loses all real aspect and imitation of nature to focus on the simple expressiveness of the artist, in shapes and colors that lack any referential component. Initiated by Vasili Kandinski, it was developed by the neoplasticist movement (De Stijl), with figures such as Piet Mondrian and Theo Van Doesburg, as well as Russian Suprematism (Kazimir Malevich). The presence of light in abstract art is inherent to its evolution, because although this movement dispenses with the theme in his works, it is no less true that it is part of this, after all, the human being cannot detach himself completely from the reality that shapes his existence. The path towards abstraction came from two paths: one of a psychic-emotive character originated by symbolism and expressionism, and the other objective-optical derived from fauvism and cubism. Light played a special role in the second one, since starting from the cubist light beams it was logical to reach the isolation of them outside the reality that originates them and their consequent expression in abstract forms.

In abstract art, light loses the prominence it has in an image based on natural reality, but its presence is still perceived in the various tonal gradations and chiaroscuro games that appear in numerous works by abstract artists such as Mark Rothko, whose images of intense chromaticism have a luminosity that seems to radiate from the color of the work itself. The pioneer of abstraction, Vasili Kandinski, received the inspiration for this type of work when he woke up one day and saw one of his paintings in which the sunlight was shining brightly, diluting the forms and accentuating the chromaticism, which showed an unprecedented brightness; he then began a process of experimentation to find the perfect chromatic harmony, giving total freedom to color without any formal or thematic subordination. Kandinski's research continued with Russian suprematism, especially with Kazimir Malevich, an artist with post-impressionist and fauvist roots who later adopted cubism, leading to a geometric abstraction in which color acquires special relevance, as shown in his Black on Black (1913) and White on White (1919).

In the interwar period, the New Objectivity (Neue Sachlichkeit) movement emerged in Germany, which returned to realistic figuration and the objective representation of the surrounding reality, with a marked social and vindictive component. Although they advocated realism, they did not renounce the technical and aesthetic achievements of avant-garde art, such as Fauvist and expressionist coloring, Futurist "simultaneous vision" or the application of photomontage to painting. In this movement, the urban landscape, populated with artificial lights, played a special role. Among its main representatives were Otto Dix, George Grosz, and Max Beckmann.

Surrealism (1924-1955) placed special emphasis on imagination, fantasy and the world of dreams, with a strong influence of psychoanalysis. Surrealist painting moved between figuration (Salvador Dalí, Paul Delvaux, René Magritte, Max Ernst) and abstraction (Joan Miró, André Masson, Yves Tanguy, Paul Klee). René Magritte treated light as a special object of research, as is evident in his work The Empire of Lights (1954, Royal Museums of Fine Arts of Belgium, Brussels), where he presents an urban landscape with a house surrounded by trees in the lower part of the painting, immersed in a nocturnal darkness, and a daytime sky furrowed with clouds in the upper part; in front of the house there is a street lamp whose light, together with that of two windows on the upper floor of the house, is reflected in a pond located at the foot of the house. The contrasting day and night represent waking and sleeping, two worlds that never come to coexist.

Dalí evolved from a formative phase in which he tried different styles (impressionism, pointillism, futurism, cubism, fauvism) to a figurative surrealism strongly influenced by Freudian psychology. In his work he showed a special interest in light, a Mediterranean light that in many of his works bathes the scene with intensity: The Bay of Cadaqués (1921, private collection), The Phantom Chariot (1933, Nahmad collection, Geneva), Solar Table (1936, Boijmans Van Beuningen Museum, Rotterdam), Composition (1942, Tel Aviv Museum of Art). It is the light of his native Empordà, a region marked by the tramuntana wind, which, according to Josep Pla, generates a "static, clear, shining, sharp, glittering" light. Dalí's treatment of light is generally surprising, with singular fantastic effects, contrasts of light and shadow, backlighting and countershadows, always in continuous research of new and surprising effects. Towards 1948 he abandoned avant-gardism and returned to classicist painting, although interpreted in a personal and subjective way, in which he continues his incessant search for new pictorial effects, as in his "atomic stage" in which he seeks to capture reality through the principles of quantum physics. Among his last works stand out for their luminosity: Christ of Saint John of the Cross (1951, Kelvingrove Museum, Glasgow), The Last Supper (1955, National Gallery of Art, Washington D. C.), The Perpignan Station (1965, Museum Ludwig, Cologne) and Cosmic Athlete (1968, Zarzuela Palace, Madrid).

Joan Miró reflected in his works a light of magical and at the same time telluric aspect, rooted in the landscape of the countryside of Tarragona that was so dear to him, as is evident in La masía (1921-1922, National Gallery of Art, Washington D. C.), illuminated by a twilight that bathes the objects in contrast with the incipient darkness of the sky. In his work he uses flat and dense colors, in preferably nocturnal environments with special prominence of empty space, while objects and figures seem bathed in an unreal light, a light that seems to come from the stars, for which he felt a special devotion.

In the United States, between the 1920s and 1930s, several figurative movements emerged, especially interested in everyday reality and life in cities, always associated with modern life and technological advances, including artificial lights in streets and avenues as well as commercial and indoor lights. The first of these movements was the Ashcan School, whose leader was Robert Henri, and where George Wesley Bellows and John French Sloan also stood out. In opposition to American Impressionism, these artists developed a style of cold tones and dark palette, with a theme centered on marginalization and the world of nightlife.

This school was followed by the so-called American realism or American Scene, whose main representative was Edward Hopper, a painter concerned with the expressive power of light, in urban images of anonymous and lonely characters framed in lights and deep shadows, with a palette of cold colors influenced by the luminosity of Vermeer. Hopper took from black and white cinema the contrast between light and shadow, which would be one of the keys to his work. He had a special predilection for the light of Cape Cod (Massachusetts), his summer resort, as can be seen in Sunlight on the Second Floor (1960, Whitney Museum of American Art, New York). His scenes are notable for their unusual perspectives, strong chromaticism and contrasts of light, in which metallic and electrifying glows stand out. In New York Cinema (1939, Museum of Modern Art, New York) he showed the interior of a cinema vaguely illuminated by — as he himself expressed in his notebook — "four sources of light, with the brightest point in the girl's hair and in the flash of the handrail". On one occasion, Hopper went so far as to state that the purpose of his painting was none other than to "paint sunlight on the side wall of a house." One critic defined the light in Hopper's mysterious paintings as a light that "illuminates but never warms," a light at the service of his vision of the desolate American urban landscape.

Latest trends 

Since the Second World War, art has undergone a vertiginous evolutionary dynamic, with styles and movements following each other more and more rapidly in time. The modern project originated with the historical avant-gardes reached its culmination with various anti-material styles that emphasized the intellectual origin of art over its material realization, such as action art and conceptual art. Once this level of analytical prospection of art was reached, the inverse effect was produced — as is usual in the history of art, where different styles confront and oppose each other, the rigor of some succeeding the excess of others, and vice versa — and a return was made to the classical forms of art, accepting its material and esthetic component, and renouncing its revolutionary and society-transforming character. Thus postmodern art emerged, where the artist shamelessly transits between different techniques and styles, without a vindictive character, and returns to artisanal work as the essence of the artist.

The first movements after the war were abstract, such as American abstract expressionism and European informalism (1945-1960), a set of trends based on the expressiveness of the artist, who renounces any rational aspect of art (structure, composition, preconceived application of color). It is an eminently abstract art, where the material support of the work becomes relevant, which assumes the leading role over any theme or composition. Abstract expressionism — also called action painting — was characterized by the use of the dripping technique, the dripping of paint on the canvas, on which the artist intervened with various tools or with his own body. Among its members, Jackson Pollock and Mark Rothko stand out. In addition to pigments, Pollock used glitter and aluminum enamel, which stands out for its brightness, giving his works a metallic light and creating a kind of chiaroscuro. For his part, Rothko worked in oil, with overlapping layers of very fluid paint, which created glazes and transparencies. He was especially interested in color, which he combined in an unprecedented way, but with a great sense of balance and harmony, and used white as a base to create luminosity. European informalism includes various currents such as tachism, art brut and matter painting. Georges Mathieu, Hans Hartung, Jean Fautrier, Jean Dubuffet, Lucio Fontana and Antoni Tàpies stand out. The latter developed a personal and innovative style, with a mixed technique of crushed marble powder with pigments, which he applied on the canvas to later carry out various interventions by means of grattage. He used to use a dark coloring, almost "dirty", but in some of his works (such as Zoom, 1946), he added a white from Spain that gave it a great luminosity.

Among the last movements especially concerned with light and color was op-art (optical art, also called kinetic or kinetic-luminescent), a style that emphasized the visual aspect of art, especially optical effects, which were produced either by optical illusions (ambiguous figures, persistent images, moiré effect), or by movement or play of light. Victor Vasarely, Jesús Rafael Soto and Yaacov Agam stood out. The technique of these artists is mixed, transcending canvas or pigment to incorporate metallic pieces, plastics and all kinds of materials; in fact, more than the material substrate of the work, the artistic matter is light, space and movement. Vasarely had a very precise and elaborate way of working, sometimes using photographs that he projected onto the canvas by means of slides, which he called "photographisms". In some works (such as Eridan, 1956) he investigated with the contrasts between light and shadow, reaching high values of light achieved with white and yellow. His Cappella series (1964) focused on the opposition between light and dark combined with shapes. The Vega series (1967) was made with aluminum paint and gold and silver glitter, which reverberated the light. Soto carried out a type of serial painting influenced by dodecaphonism, with primary colors that stand out for their transparency and provoke a strong sensation of movement. Agam, on the other hand, was particularly interested in chromatic combinations, working with 150 different colors, in painting or sculpture-painting.

Among the figurative trends is pop art (1955-1970), which emerged in the United States as a movement to reject abstract expressionism. It includes a series of authors who returned to figuration, with a marked component of popular inspiration, with images inspired by the world of advertising, photography, comics, and mass media. Roy Lichtenstein, Tom Wesselmann, James Rosenquist, and Andy Warhol stood out. Lichtenstein was particularly inspired by comics, with paintings that look like vignettes, sometimes with the typical graininess of printed comics. He used flat inks, without mixtures, in pure colors. He also produced landscapes, with light colors and great luminosity. Wesselmann specialized in nudes, generally in bathrooms, with a cold and aseptic appearance. He also used pure colors, without tonal gradations, with sharp contrasts. Rosenquist had a more surrealist vein, with a preference for consumerist and advertising themes. Warhol was the most mediatic and commercial artist of this group. He used to work in silkscreen, in series ranging from portraits of famous people such as Elvis Presley, Marilyn Monroe or Mao Tse-tung to all kinds of objects, such as his series of Campbell's soup cans, made with a garish and strident colorism and a pure, impersonal technique.

Abstraction resurfaced between the 1960s and 1980s with Post-painterly abstraction and Minimalism. Post-painterly abstraction (also called "New Abstraction") focused on geometrism, with an austere, cold and impersonal language, due to an anti-anthropocentric tendency that could be glimpsed in these years in art and culture in general, also present in pop-art, a style with which it coexisted. Thus, post-pictorial abstraction focuses on form and color, without making any iconographic reading, only interested in the visual impact, without any reflection. They use striking colors, sometimes of a metallic or fluorescent nature. Barnett Newman, Frank Stella, Ellsworth Kelly and Kenneth Noland stand out. Minimalism was a trend that involved a process of dematerialization that would lead to conceptual art. They are works of marked simplicity, reduced to a minimum motif, refined to the initial approach of the author. Robert Mangold and Robert Ryman stand out, who had in common the preference for monochrome, with a refined technique in which the brushstroke is not noticed and the use of light tones, preferably pastel colors.

Figuration returned again with hyperrealism — which emerged around 1965 — a trend characterized by its superlative and exaggerated vision of reality, which is captured with great accuracy in all its details, with an almost photographic aspect, in which Chuck Close, Richard Estes, Don Eddy, John Salt, and Ralph Goings stand out. These artists are concerned, among other things, with details such as glitter and reflections in cars and shop windows, as well as light effects, especially artificial city lights, in urban views with neon lights and the like. Linked to this movement is the Spaniard Antonio López García, author of academic works but where the most meticulous description of reality is combined with a vague unreal aspect close to magical realism. His urban landscapes of wide atmospheres stand out (Madrid sur, 1965-1985; Madrid desde Torres Blancas, 1976-1982), as well as images with an almost photographic aspect such as Mujer en la bañera (1968), in which a woman takes a bath in an atmosphere of electric light reflected on the bathroom tiles, creating an intense and vibrant composition.

Another movement especially concerned with the effects of light has been neo-luminism, an American movement inspired by American luminism and the Hudson River School, from which they adopt its majestic skies and calm water marinas, as well as the atmospheric effects of light rendered in subtle gradations. Its main representatives are: James Doolin, April Gornik, Norman Lundin, Scott Cameron, Steven DaLuz and Pauline Ziegen.

Since 1975, postmodern art has predominated in the international art scene: it emerged in opposition to the so-called modern art, it is the art of postmodernity, a socio-cultural theory that postulates the current validity of a historical period that would have surpassed the modern project, that is, the cultural, political and economic roots of the Contemporary Age, marked culturally by the Enlightenment, politically by the French Revolution and economically by the Industrial Revolution. These artists assume the failure of the avant-garde movements as the failure of the modern project: the avant-garde intended to eliminate the distance between art and life, to universalize art; the postmodern artist, on the other hand, is self-referential, art speaks of art, and does not intend to do social work. Postmodern painting returns to the traditional techniques and themes of art, although with a certain stylistic mixification, taking advantage of the resources of all the preceding artistic periods and intermingling and deconstructing them, in a procedure that has been baptized as "appropriationism" or artistic "nomadism". Individual artists such as Jeff Koons, David Salle, Jean-Michel Basquiat, Keith Haring, Julian Schnabel, Eric Fischl or Miquel Barceló stand out, as well as various movements such as the Italian trans-avant-garde (Sandro Chia, Francesco Clemente, Enzo Cucchi, Nicola De Maria, Mimmo Paladino), German Neo-Expressionism (Anselm Kiefer, Georg Baselitz, Jörg Immendorff, Markus Lüpertz, Sigmar Polke), Neo-Mannerism, free figuration, among others.

See also 

 Light art
 Light painting
 History of painting
 Periods in Western art history

References

Bibliography 

 
 
 
 
 
 
 
 
 
 
 
 
 
 
 
 
 
 
 
 
 
 
 
 
 
 
 
 
 
 
 
 
 
 
 
 
 
 
 
 
 
 
 
 
 
 
 
 
 
 
 
 
 
 
 
 
 
 
 
 
 
 
 
 
 
 
 
 
 
 
 
 
 
 
 
 
 
 
 
 
 
 
 
 
 
 
 
 
 
 
 
 
 
 
 
 
 
 
 
 
 
 
 
 
 
 
 
 

Painting
Light
Renaissance
Modern art
Light art
Medieval art
Luminism (American art style)
Leonardo da Vinci
Vincent van Gogh
Jean-Michel Basquiat